Agrilus is a genus of jewel beetles, notable for having the largest number of species (about 3000) of any single genus in the animal kingdom.

[[File:Agrilus crepuscularis Jendek & Chamorro, holotype male, lateral view - ZooKeys-239-071-g003.jpeg|thumb|Agrilus crepuscularis holotype.]]

Species

 Agrilus abantiades Descarpentries & Villiers, 1963
 Agrilus abditus Horn, 1891
 Agrilus abdominalis Saunders, 1874
 Agrilus abductus Horn, 1891
 Agrilus abeillei (Théry, 1905)
 Agrilus aberlenci Curletti, 1997
 Agrilus aberrans Kerremans, 1900
 Agrilus abhayi Baudon, 1965
 Agrilus abjectus Horn, 1891
 Agrilus abodimanganus Obenberger, 1931
 Agrilus aborigines Curletti, 2001
 Agrilus abramii Curletti & Dutto, 1999
 Agrilus absonus Théry, 1934
 Agrilus abstersus Horn, 1891
 Agrilus abyssiniae Obenberger, 1935
 Agrilus abyssinicus Obenberger, 1917
 Agrilus acaciae Fisher, 1928
 Agrilus acanthopterus Harold, 1869
 Agrilus acastus Kerremans, 1913
 Agrilus acceptus Waterhouse, 1889
 Agrilus acclivis Waterhouse, 1889
 Agrilus acer Curletti, 2006
 Agrilus achardi Obenberger, 1935
 Agrilus achepei Curletti, 2002
 Agrilus achilleus Obenberger, 1935
 Agrilus acoloai Fisher, 1938
 Agrilus acroneus Obenberger, 1942
 Agrilus acuductus Waterhouse, 1889
 Agrilus aculeatus Gory, 1841
 Agrilus aculeipennis Chevrolat, 1838
 Agrilus acuminatus Gory, 1841
 Agrilus acutipennis Mannerheim, 1837 — spotworm borer
 Agrilus acutus (Thunberg, 1787)
 Agrilus adamas Curletti, 2000
 Agrilus adamsoni Fisher, 1944
 Agrilus adansoni Obenberger, 1933
 Agrilus addagallensis Obenberger, 1935
 Agrilus addendus Crotch, 1873
 Agrilus adelphinus Kerremans, 1895
 Agrilus adelungi Obenberger, 1933
 Agrilus adinocephalus Curletti, 2005
 Agrilus adjunctus Waterhouse, 1889
 Agrilus adlbaueri Niehuis, 1987
 Agrilus admirabilis Hespenheide, 1990
 Agrilus admonitor Obenberger, 1924
 Agrilus adonis Deyrolle, 1864
 Agrilus adspersus Kerremans, 1890
 Agrilus adustellus Thomson, 1879
 Agrilus advena Obenberger, 1931
 Agrilus aebii Pochon, 1971
 Agrilus aeneellus Thomson, 1878
 Agrilus aeneiceps Kerremans, 1899
 Agrilus aeneicollis Saunders, 1866
 Agrilus aeneipennis Deyrolle, 1864
 Agrilus aeneocephalus Fisher, 1928
 Agrilus aeneoclarus Bourgoin, 1922
 Agrilus aeneocupreus Kerremans, 1899
 Agrilus aeneolus Deyrolle, 1864
 Agrilus aeneomaculatus Deyrolle, 1864
 Agrilus aenescentellus Obenberger, 1936
 Agrilus aeneus Gory & Laporte, 1837
 Agrilus aequalis Kerremans, 1900
 Agrilus aequatoris Obenberger, 1917
 Agrilus aequicollis Eschscholtz, 1822
 Agrilus aereus Saunders, 1866
 Agrilus aerosus Ganglbauer, 1890
 Agrilus aesquilius Obenberger, 1947
 Agrilus aestimatus Kerremans, 1897
 Agrilus aethiops Hespenheide, 1990
 Agrilus affabilis Kerremans, 1897
 Agrilus affinis Waterhouse, 1889
 Agrilus africanus Kerremans, 1899
 Agrilus agnatulus Obenberger, 1931
 Agrilus agnatus Kerremans, 1892
 Agrilus agoretus Obenberger, 1935
 Agrilus agrestis Deyrolle, 1864
 Agrilus agrius Obenberger, 1935
 Agrilus agronomus Obenberger, 1935
 Agrilus aguinaldoi Fisher, 1921
 Agrilus alacris Kerremans, 1896
 Agrilus alashanensis Obenberger, 1936
 Agrilus albertianus Descarpentries & Villiers, 1967
 Agrilus albicollis (Waterhouse, 1887)
 Agrilus albizziae Fisher, 1935
 Agrilus albocomus Fisher, 1928
 Agrilus albofasciatus Waterhouse, 1889
 Agrilus albogaster Deyrolle, 1864
 Agrilus albogularis Gory, 1841
 Agrilus albolatus Deyrolle, 1864
 Agrilus alboluteus Curletti, 1995
 Agrilus albomaculifer Saunders, 1870
 Agrilus albomarginatus Fiori, 1906
 Agrilus albonotatus Thomson, 1879
 Agrilus albopictus Kerremans, 1892
 Agrilus albopunctatus Deyrolle, 1864
 Agrilus alborubronigrus Hespenheide, 1990
 Agrilus albosericellus Obenberger, 1924
 Agrilus albostictus Kerremans, 1913
 Agrilus albovariegatus Hespenheide, 1990
 Agrilus albovittatus Thomson, 1879
 Agrilus alcinous Obenberger, 1935
 Agrilus alemani Dugès, 1891
 Agrilus alesi Obenberger, 1935
 Agrilus aleus Gory, 1841
 Agrilus alexandri Obenberger, 1933
 Agrilus algiricus Obenberger, 1923
 Agrilus aliciae Bellamy, 2005
 Agrilus allardi Curletti, 1997
 Agrilus allectorellus Thomson, 1879
 Agrilus allisoni Curletti, 2006
 Agrilus alluaudi Kerremans, 1903
 Agrilus almenus Gory, 1841
 Agrilus alpenae Baudon, 1968
 Agrilus alpha Obenberger, 1935
 Agrilus alutaceicollis Obenberger, 1930
 Agrilus amamioshimanus Kurosawa, 1964
 Agrilus amazo Obenberger, 1933
 Agrilus amazonicus Kerremans, 1897
 Agrilus ambifarius Curletti, 2006
 Agrilus ambiguus Kerremans, 1895
 Agrilus ambodimanganus Obenberger, 1931
 Agrilus amelanchieri Knull, 1944
 Agrilus amethysticollis Deyrolle, 1864
 Agrilus amhar Obenberger, 1935
 Agrilus amicalis Obenberger, 1922
 Agrilus amicus Deyrolle, 1864
 Agrilus amoenulus Kerremans, 1903
 Agrilus amorphus Kerremans, 1900
 Agrilus amphiaraus Obenberger, 1936
 Agrilus amphion Obenberger, 1935
 Agrilus ampliatus Kerremans, 1900
 Agrilus amplicollis Kerremans, 1888
 Agrilus amulius Obenberger, 1936
 Agrilus anabates Obenberger, 1924
 Agrilus anachlorus Obenberger, 1924
 Agrilus analis Kerremans, 1896
 Agrilus andersoni Hespenheide, 2008
 Agrilus andresi Obenberger, 1920
 Agrilus androgynus Curletti, 2006
 Agrilus andrusi Baudon, 1968
 Agrilus angelicus Horn, 1891
 Agrilus angolanus Obenberger, 1935
 Agrilus angolensis Théry, 1947
 Agrilus angolus Bellamy, 1998
 Agrilus angulatus (Fabricius, 1798)
 Agrilus angustus (Chevrolat, 1835)
 Agrilus animatus Fisher, 1944
 Agrilus annoi Baudon, 1968
 Agrilus anomus Obenberger, 1935
 Agrilus antali Obenberger, 1933
 Agrilus antennalis Descarpentries, 1959
 Agrilus antennatus Waterhouse, 1889
 Agrilus antepodex Thomson, 1878
 Agrilus anthaxioides Hespenheide in Hespenheide & Bellamy, 2009
 Agrilus anthracinus Deyrolle, 1864
 Agrilus anthrax Obenberger, 1931
 Agrilus antiquus Mulsant & Rey, 1863
 Agrilus antonii Obenberger, 1933
 Agrilus anxius Gory, 1841 — bronze birch borer
 Agrilus apaturus Obenberger, 1935
 Agrilus apellos Pochon, 1971
 Agrilus apicalis Waterhouse, 1889
 Agrilus apicaureus Jendek in Jendek & Grebennikov, 2009
 Agrilus arabeon Obenberger, 1935
 Agrilus araeus Obenberger, 1935
 Agrilus aragonis Obenberger, 1933
 Agrilus araneipes Obenberger, 1932
 Agrilus araxenus Iablokoff-Khnzorian, 1960
 Agrilus arbuti Fisher, 1928
 Agrilus archaicus Obenberger, 1916
 Agrilus arcuatus (Say, 1825)
 Agrilus ardoini Descarpentries & Villiers, 1963
 Agrilus ardosiellus Obenberger, 1933
 Agrilus arenatus Curletti, 1997
 Agrilus areolatus Fairmaire, 1898
 Agrilus arestini Théry, 1937
 Agrilus argenteornatus Obenberger, 1924
 Agrilus argentinus Kerremans, 1903
 Agrilus argodi Obenberger, 1935
 Agrilus argus Obenberger, 1935
 Agrilus argyrograptus Obenberger, 1933
 Agrilus argyrothrix Obenberger, 1935
 Agrilus argythamniae Hespenheide & Westcott, 2011
 Agrilus aridosus Obenberger, 1936
 Agrilus arisanus Miwa & Chûjô, 1940
 Agrilus aristaeus Kerremans, 1913
 Agrilus aritai Tôyama, 1985
 Agrilus arizonicus Obenberger, 1936
 Agrilus arizonus Knull, 1934
 Agrilus armillatus Kerremans, 1903
 Agrilus armstrongi Obenberger, 1959
 Agrilus arnus Gory, 1841
 Agrilus arsenevi Jendek in Jendek & Grebennikov, 2009
 Agrilus artevansi Curletti & Bellamy, 2006
 Agrilus asahinai Kurosawa, 1956
 Agrilus ascanius Deyrolle, 1864
 Agrilus ashlocki Baudon, 1968
 Agrilus asiaticus Kerremans, 1898
 Agrilus asperulus Waterhouse, 1889
 Agrilus assamensis Obenberger, 1936
 Agrilus assimilis Hope, 1846
 Agrilus assinicus Kerremans, 1903
 Agrilus atahualpa Obenberger, 1935
 Agrilus ater (Linnaeus, 1767)
 Agrilus atkinsoni Hespenheide, 1990
 Agrilus atlanticus Curletti, 2005
 Agrilus atomus Théry, 1904
 Agrilus atratulus Obenberger, 1924
 Agrilus atricornis Fisher, 1928
 Agrilus atripennis Chevrolat, 1835
 Agrilus atriplicis Théry, 1900
 Agrilus attenuatus Fisher, 1921
 Agrilus attila Obenberger, 1930
 Agrilus audax Horn, 1891
 Agrilus augustus Obenberger, 1933
 Agrilus aurantioguttatus Hespenheide, 1990
 Agrilus aurarius (Kerremans, 1892)
 Agrilus auratilis Bourgoin, 1922
 Agrilus auratus Deyrolle, 1864
 Agrilus aurelianus Obenberger, 1947
 Agrilus aureocoerulans Obenberger, 1924
 Agrilus aureus Chevrolat, 1838
 Agrilus auriceps Kerremans, 1899
 Agrilus auricollis Kiesenwetter, 1857
 Agrilus aurifrons Kerremans, 1897
 Agrilus aurilaterus Waterhouse, 1889
 Agrilus auripes Deyrolle, 1864
 Agrilus auripilis Deyrolle, 1864
 Agrilus auristernum Obenberger, 1924
 Agrilus auritinctus Curletti, 2003
 Agrilus auritus Chevrolat, 1838
 Agrilus auriventris Saunders, 1873
 Agrilus auroapicalis Kurosawa, 1957
 Agrilus aurocephalus Gory, 1841
 Agrilus aurociliatus Théry, 1904
 Agrilus aurocyaneus Kerremans, 1900
 Agrilus auroguttatus Schaeffer, 1905
 Agrilus auroornatus Obenberger, 1940
 Agrilus auropictus Kerremans, 1912
 Agrilus aurosus Descarpentries & Villiers, 1963
 Agrilus aurovittatus Hope, 1846
 Agrilus aurulentus Hespenheide, 1990
 Agrilus australasiae Gory & Laporte, 1837
 Agrilus avulsus Kerremans, 1903
 Agrilus azureus Kerremans, 1899
 Agrilus babai Tôyama, 1988
 Agrilus babaulti Théry, 1930
 Agrilus baboquivariae Fisher, 1928
 Agrilus babuinus Curletti & Dutto, 1999
 Agrilus bacchaeus Obenberger, 1936
 Agrilus bacchus Kerremans, 1913
 Agrilus badius Kerremans, 1897
 Agrilus baeri Obenberger, 1933
 Agrilus baili Curletti, 2005
 Agrilus baitetanus Curletti, 2006
 Agrilus bakeri Kerremans, 1914
 Agrilus balaenoides Waterhouse, 1889
 Agrilus balazuci Descarpentries & Villiers, 1963
 Agrilus balena Curletti, 1998
 Agrilus baliolus Kerremans, 1897
 Agrilus balloui Fisher, 1938
 Agrilus balnearis Kerremans, 1914
 Agrilus banahaoensis Fisher, 1921
 Agrilus banguinus Obenberger, 1931
 Agrilus banksi Obenberger, 1933
 Agrilus baobdil Obenberger, 1913
 Agrilus baoloc Jendek, 2001
 Agrilus barberi Fisher, 1928
 Agrilus barberoi Curletti, 2002
 Agrilus barbutulus Curletti, 1998
 Agrilus bareinus Obenberger, 1923
 Agrilus baringanus Obenberger, 1931
 Agrilus barkerellus Obenberger, 1936
 Agrilus barkeri Obenberger, 1931
 Agrilus barombinus Obenberger, 1935
 Agrilus baroni Gory & Laporte, 1837
 Agrilus barrandei Obenberger, 1933
 Agrilus barrati Descarpentries & Villiers, 1963
 Agrilus barri Hespenheide & Westcott, 2011
 Agrilus barriesi Curletti, 2011
 Agrilus barriosi Curletti, 2000
 Agrilus bartolozzii Curletti, 2000
 Agrilus basalis Chevrolat, 1835
 Agrilus basilaris Waterhouse, 1889
 Agrilus basilewskyanus Descarpentries & Villiers, 1963
 Agrilus basseti Curletti, 2000
 Agrilus bassetianus Curletti, 2003
 Agrilus bastianae Baudon, 1965
 Agrilus bathyllus Obenberger, 1933
 Agrilus baueri Heyden, 1862
 Agrilus bauhiniae Fisher, 1935
 Agrilus baviensis Descarpentries & Villiers, 1963
 Agrilus baxii Gory & Laporte, 1837
 Agrilus bayoni Kerremans, 1910
 Agrilus beatissimus Descarpentries & Villiers, 1963
 Agrilus beauprei Théry, 1930
 Agrilus beckeri Curletti, 2000
 Agrilus bedelianus Obenberger, 1933
 Agrilus belides Obenberger, 1936
 Agrilus bellamyi Hespenheide, 2010
 Agrilus bellator Kerremans, 1900
 Agrilus bellicus Kerremans, 1903
 Agrilus bellus Waterhouse, 1889
 Agrilus belzebuth Obenberger, 1935
 Agrilus benevolus Kerremans, 1903
 Agrilus beniensis Fisher, 1925
 Agrilus benjamini Fisher, 1928
 Agrilus bennigseni Kerremans, 1899
 Agrilus bentseni Knull, 1954
 Agrilus berberus Curletti, 2003
 Agrilus bergi Kerremans, 1903
 Agrilus bergrothi Obenberger, 1923
 Agrilus berkwae Curletti, 2002
 Agrilus bernardii Descarpentries & Villiers, 1963
 Agrilus bespencus Barr, 2008
 Agrilus bettotanus Fisher, 1930
 Agrilus betulanigrae MacRae, 2003
 Agrilus betuleti (Ratzeberg, 1837)
 Agrilus biakanus Curletti, 2006
 Agrilus biankii Obenberger, 1933
 Agrilus biasoni Baudon, 1968
 Agrilus bicarinatus Waterhouse, 1889
 Agrilus bicoloropsis Bellamy & Hespenheide, 2002
 Agrilus bicornis Théry, 1930
 Agrilus bidentulus Ganglbauer, 1890
 Agrilus biemarginatus Waterhouse, 1889
 Agrilus bifenestratus Thomson, 1878
 Agrilus bifenestrellatus Obenberger, 1935
 Agrilus biformis Hespenheide, 1990
 Agrilus bifoveicollis Kerremans, 1897
 Agrilus bifoveolatus Kerremans, 1895
 Agrilus biguttatus (Fabricius, 1776) — oak splendour beetle
 Agrilus bihamatus Deyrolle, 1864
 Agrilus biimpressus Waterhouse, 1889
 Agrilus bilby Curletti, 2001
 Agrilus bilineatus (Weber, 1801)
 Agrilus bilobus Obenberger, 1935
 Agrilus bilyi Curletti, 1997
 Agrilus bimaculatus Dugès, 1891
 Agrilus binderi (Obenberger, 1924)
 Agrilus binhensis Descarpentries & Villiers, 1963
 Agrilus binodifrons Obenberger, 1935
 Agrilus binotatus Gory, 1841
 Agrilus biplagiatus (Waterhouse, 1889)
 Agrilus birmanicus Kerremans, 1892
 Agrilus biscrensis Pic, 1918
 Agrilus bisignatus Fisher, 1921
 Agrilus bispinosus Carter, 1924
 Agrilus bistrilineatus Obenberger, 1935
 Agrilus bituberculatus Jendek, 2007
 Agrilus bivittatellus Obenberger, 1935
 Agrilus bivittiger Obenberger, 1923
 Agrilus blairi Bourgoin, 1925
 Agrilus blairianus Obenberger, 1935
 Agrilus blanchardii Saunders, 1871
 Agrilus blanditiosus Obenberger, 1933
 Agrilus blandulus Guérin-Ménéville, 1844
 Agrilus blandus Horn, 1891
 Agrilus blattaeicollis Bourgoin, 1922
 Agrilus boanoi Curletti, 1998
 Agrilus bojasinskii Holynski, 1998
 Agrilus bokori Gebhardt, 1925
 Agrilus bolamanus Kerremans, 1906
 Agrilus bolivari Obenberger, 1921
 Agrilus boliviensis Fisher, 1925
 Agrilus bonadonai Descarpentries & Villiers, 1963
 Agrilus bonariensis Kerremans, 1903
 Agrilus bondroiti Obenberger, 1933
 Agrilus boninensis Kurosawa, 1963
 Agrilus bonnotei Bourgoin, 1925
 Agrilus bonsae Descarpentries & Villiers, 1963
 Agrilus bonvouloirii Murray, 1868
 Agrilus bothrops Curletti, 2005
 Agrilus botswanus Curletti, 2000
 Agrilus boudieri Obenberger, 1933
 Agrilus bourgognei Descarpentries & Villiers, 1963
 Agrilus bourgoini Obenberger, 1935
 Agrilus bozzallai Curletti, 2003
 Agrilus braconicoloratus Hespenheide, 1990
 Agrilus braconoides Hespenheide, 2010
 Agrilus bradti Cazier, 1951
 Agrilus braemi Obenberger, 
 Agrilus brahma Obenberger, 1916
 Agrilus brancsiki Nonfried, 1895
 Agrilus brasilius Bellamy, 1998
 Agrilus braunsi Obenberger, 1931
 Agrilus brechteli Curletti & van Harten, 2004
 Agrilus bremus Obenberger, 1935
 Agrilus breuningi Descarpentries & Villiers, 1963
 Agrilus brevicollis Kerremans, 1894
 Agrilus brevicornis Guérin-Méneville, 1840
 Agrilus brevis Carter, 1924
 Agrilus brevitarsis Lewis, 1893
 Agrilus brigitteae Baudon, 1968
 Agrilus bronzeellus Thomson, 1879
 Agrilus bruchi Kerremans, 1903
 Agrilus bruchianus Obenberger, 1933
 Agrilus brunnipennis Chevrolat, 1838
 Agrilus bruschii Curletti, 1998
 Agrilus brydli Obenberger, 1924
 Agrilus buambanus Obenberger, 1931
 Agrilus buani Curletti & Vayssières, 2007
 Agrilus bucephalus Daniel, 1903
 Agrilus bucolicus Kerremans, 1894
 Agrilus buenavistae Obenberger, 1933
 Agrilus buffoni Obenberger, 1933
 Agrilus bulawayanus Obenberger, 1935
 Agrilus bumbulinus Obenberger, 1931
 Agrilus buraicus Obenberger, 1928
 Agrilus buresi Obenberger, 1935
 Agrilus burgeoni Obenberger, 1935
 Agrilus burkei Fisher, 1917
 Agrilus buruanus Obenberger, 1932
 Agrilus buscki Fisher, 1938
 Agrilus butuanensis Fisher, 1921
 Agrilus buyssoni Obenberger, 1933
 Agrilus cabellanus Kerremans, 1896
 Agrilus cadoli Baudon, 1968
 Agrilus caducus Curletti, 2000
 Agrilus caepa Curletti & Dutto, 1999
 Agrilus caesalpiniae Hespenheide, 1990
 Agrilus caesareus Obenberger, 1935
 Agrilus cailloli Obenberger, 1935
 Agrilus calcar Curletti, 2009
 Agrilus caligans Bourgoin, 1925
 Agrilus callani Fisher, 1943
 Agrilus calligatus Obenberger, 1931
 Agrilus calliginulus Obenberger, 1935
 Agrilus calvulus Obenberger, 1935
 Agrilus camaxtlei Fisher, 1938
 Agrilus cameroni Bellamy, 1999
 Agrilus cameroonensis Obenberger, 1931
 Agrilus camerunicus Kerremans, 1899
 Agrilus caminosus Obenberger, 1933
 Agrilus campestris Deyrolle, 1864
 Agrilus camsingi Baudon, 1968
 Agrilus canaliculatus Kerremans, 1898
 Agrilus candidiventris Obenberger, 1936
 Agrilus canelonius Obenberger, 1933
 Agrilus canidius Descarpentries & Villiers, 1963
 Agrilus cannulus Obenberger, 1924
 Agrilus canus Kerremans, 1912
 Agrilus capicolus Kerremans, 1898
 Agrilus capillitectus Obenberger, 1933
 Agrilus capitatus Deyrolle, 1864
 Agrilus captivus Fisher, 1944
 Agrilus caracanus Obenberger, 1933
 Agrilus carbo Obenberger, 1923
 Agrilus carbonarius Deyrolle, 1864
 Agrilus cardaces Obenberger, 1936
 Agrilus cardiaspis Kerremans, 1897
 Agrilus cardoni Théry, 1930
 Agrilus carettei Baudon, 1968
 Agrilus carilloensis Fisher, 1938
 Agrilus carinellifer Obenberger, 1924
 Agrilus carinellus Thomson, 1879
 Agrilus carinelytratus Jendek in Jendek & Grebennikov, 2009
 Agrilus carinihumeralis Kurosawa, 1964
 Agrilus carinipennis Obenberger, 1924
 Agrilus carinus Obenberger, 1932
 Agrilus cariosulus Obenberger, 1935
 Agrilus cariosus Kerremans, 1899
 Agrilus carissimus (Waterhouse, 1889)
 Agrilus carmineus Dugès, 1891
 Agrilus caroli Kerremans, 1903
 Agrilus carolinae Curletti, 2002
 Agrilus carpini Knull, 1923
 Agrilus carterellus Obenberger, 1959
 Agrilus cartesias Obenberger, 1933
 Agrilus cartistus Obenberger, 1932
 Agrilus carystus Obenberger, 1935
 Agrilus casalei Curletti, 1997
 Agrilus cascelius Obenberger, 1935
 Agrilus casignetus Obenberger, 1932
 Agrilus castus Descarpentries & Villiers, 1963
 Agrilus catalinae Knull, 1940
 Agrilus catamarcanus Obenberger, 1916
 Agrilus catherinae (Chevrolat, 1835)
 Agrilus caucasicola Semenov, 1891
 Agrilus caudalis Gory & Laporte, 1837
 Agrilus caudatus Mannerheim, 1837
 Agrilus causalis Obenberger, 1935
 Agrilus caussei Curletti, 2000
 Agrilus cavatus Chevrolat, 1838
 Agrilus cavazzutii Curletti, 2006
 Agrilus caviceps Kerremans, 1900
 Agrilus cavifrons Waterhouse, 1889
 Agrilus cavinas Fisher, 1925
 Agrilus caxaxtlei Fisher, 1938
 Agrilus celebicola Obenberger, 1924
 Agrilus celebiensis Deyrolle, 1864
 Agrilus celerae Descarpentries & Villiers, 1963
 Agrilus celsus Kerremans, 1897
 Agrilus celti Knull, 1920
 Agrilus centralis Waterhouse, 1889
 Agrilus centunculus Curletti, 2005
 Agrilus centurial Jendek, 2001
 Agrilus cephalicus LeConte, 1860
 Agrilus cephalotes Waterhouse, 1889
 Agrilus cercidii Knull, 1937
 Agrilus cerinoguttatus Chevrolat, 1835
 Agrilus cernosvitovi Obenberger, 1935
 Agrilus cernus Obenberger, 1931
 Agrilus cerrolatus Curletti, 2010
 Agrilus certus Descarpentries & Villiers, 1963
 Agrilus ceruleodepilis Thomson, 1879
 Agrilus cervicatus Descarpentries & Villiers, 1963
 Agrilus cervus Curletti, 2006
 Agrilus ceylonensis Obenberger, 1916
 Agrilus chacoensis Obenberger, 1935
 Agrilus chalcoderes Chevrolat, 1835
 Agrilus chalcoventris Gory, 1841
 Agrilus chamelae Hespenheide, 1990
 Agrilus chameleon Curletti, 2002
 Agrilus champasak Jendek, 2000
 Agrilus champlaini Frost, 1912
 Agrilus chapaensis Descarpentries & Villiers, 1967
 Agrilus chaparensis Pochon, 1971
 Agrilus charaxes Obenberger, 1939
 Agrilus charismaticus Jendek, 2000
 Agrilus chekiangensis Gebhardt, 1928
 Agrilus chembae Théry, 1934
 Agrilus chevreuli Obenberger, 1933
 Agrilus chevrolati Waterhouse, 1889
 Agrilus chiangdaoensis Jendek, 1994
 Agrilus chicomecoatlae Fisher, 1938
 Agrilus chihuahuae Cazier, 1951
 Agrilus chionochaetus Obenberger, 1913
 Agrilus chiricahuae Fisher, 1928
 Agrilus chirindanus Obenberger, 1935
 Agrilus chiromoensis Obenberger, 1935
 Agrilus chlorocephalus Waterhouse, 1889
 Agrilus chlorochrous Obenberger, 1935
 Agrilus chlorophyllus Abeille de Perrin, 1904
 Agrilus chlorus Dugès, 1891
 Agrilus chobauti Abeille de Perrin, 1897
 Agrilus chopardi Descarpentries & Villiers, 1963
 Agrilus chounramanyi Baudon, 1965
 Agrilus chowni Curletti, 2000
 Agrilus chrysicollis Deyrolle, 1864
 Agrilus chrysipleuris Obenberger, 1931
 Agrilus chrysobothroides Hespenheide in Hespenheide & Bellamy, 2009
 Agrilus chrysochloris Deyrolle, 1864
 Agrilus chrysochrous Obenberger, 1935
 Agrilus chrysophanus Gory, 1841
 Agrilus chrysostictoides Obenberger, 1935
 Agrilus chrysostictus (Klug, 1825)
 Agrilus chujoi Kurosawa, 1985
 Agrilus cibarius Fisher, 1944
 Agrilus ciliatipes Deyrolle, 1864
 Agrilus cinctus (Olivier, 1790)
 Agrilus cingulatus Kerremans, 1897
 Agrilus ciradi Curletti, 2002
 Agrilus circumflutus Obenberger, 1947
 Agrilus circus Obenberger, 1932
 Agrilus cisses Obenberger, 1932
 Agrilus citrinolatus Thomson, 1879
 Agrilus civacoatlae Fisher, 1938
 Agrilus civapipiltiae Fisher, 1938
 Agrilus cizeki Curletti, 2005
 Agrilus clabaudi Baudon, 1965
 Agrilus cladrastis Knull, 1945
 Agrilus clairvillei Obenberger, 1933
 Agrilus clangedon Obenberger, 1933
 Agrilus claudulus Obenberger, 1935
 Agrilus clausus Kerremans, 1897
 Agrilus clavaraui Obenberger, 1933
 Agrilus clavatus Kerremans, 1899
 Agrilus claveri Kerremans, 1900
 Agrilus claviger Obenberger, 1935
 Agrilus clazon Obenberger, 1933
 Agrilus cliftoni Knull, 1941
 Agrilus clytrinoides Bellamy & Hespenheide, 2002
 Agrilus coatlycuei Fisher, 1938
 Agrilus cobosinus Curletti, 1995
 Agrilus cochinchinae Obenberger, 1924
 Agrilus cochisei Knull, 1948
 Agrilus cockatoo Curletti, 2001
 Agrilus coelestis Deyrolle, 1864
 Agrilus coeruleicollis Saunders, 1866
 Agrilus coeruleonigra Fisher, 1929
 Agrilus colasi Descarpentries & Villiers, 1963
 Agrilus collaris (Waterhouse, 1889)
 Agrilus collartianus Descarpentries & Villiers, 1963
 Agrilus colligatus Obenberger, 1931
 Agrilus collignoni Curletti, 2000
 Agrilus colluviellus Thomson, 1879
 Agrilus colombianus Gory, 1841
 Agrilus colonicus Curletti, 2005
 Agrilus coloratus Kerremans, 1894
 Agrilus comes Kerremans, 1896
 Agrilus comitulus Obenberger, 1935
 Agrilus comizon Obenberger, 1935
 Agrilus compitalis Obenberger, 1936
 Agrilus complexus (Waterhouse, 1889)
 Agrilus compressus Kerremans, 1899
 Agrilus comptus Kerremans, 1900
 Agrilus comstocki Obenberger, 1933
 Agrilus concavus Deyrolle, 1864
 Agrilus concinnus Horn, 1891
 Agrilus concors Obenberger, 1935
 Agrilus concupiens Obenberger, 1935
 Agrilus confinis Faldermann, 1835
 Agrilus conformis Gory, 1841
 Agrilus confossicollis Kerremans, 1892
 Agrilus confusus Waterhouse, 1889
 Agrilus confutus Obenberger, 1936
 Agrilus congener Kerremans, 1896
 Agrilus conicus Gory, 1841
 Agrilus conissalus Obenberger, 1935
 Agrilus connexus Kerremans, 1900
 Agrilus connicki Baudon, 1968
 Agrilus conradsi Obenberger, 1940
 Agrilus conradti Obenberger, 1935
 Agrilus consentaneus Kerremans, 1897
 Agrilus consimilis Waterhouse, 1889
 Agrilus constantini Obenberger, 1927
 Agrilus consularis Kerremans, 1897
 Agrilus consumptoris Fisher, 1944
 Agrilus continuatus Waterhouse, 1909
 Agrilus contractus Fisher, 1930
 Agrilus contristatus Obenberger, 1935
 Agrilus contrucidatus Obenberger, 1935
 Agrilus convergens Fisher, 1930
 Agrilus convexicollis Redtenbacher, 1849
 Agrilus convexifrons Kiesenwetter, 1857
 Agrilus convexiusculus Kerremans, 1912
 Agrilus convexus Kerremans, 1900
 Agrilus convictor Descarpentries & Villiers, 1963
 Agrilus conviva Obenberger, 1933
 Agrilus coolsi Curletti, 1997
 Agrilus coomani Bourgoin, 1925
 Agrilus copraeus Obenberger, 1932
 Agrilus coracicolor Obenberger, 1931
 Agrilus coraebiformis Kerremans, 1908
 Agrilus coraeboides Kerremans, 1900
 Agrilus corallinus Curletti, 2006
 Agrilus cordillerae Kirsch, 1873
 Agrilus cordovanus Obenberger, 1933
 Agrilus coreanus Obenberger, 1935
 Agrilus cornutus Kerremans, 1898
 Agrilus correctus Thomson, 1878
 Agrilus corrugatus (Waterhouse, 1889)
 Agrilus corylicola Fisher, 1928
 Agrilus corysson Obenberger, 1933
 Agrilus costifer Kerremans, 1903
 Agrilus costipennis Kerremans, 1899
 Agrilus costulatus Harold, 1878
 Agrilus coxalis Waterhouse, 1889 — gold spotted oak borer
 Agrilus coyaudi Curletti, 2009
 Agrilus crapulellus Thomson, 1879
 Agrilus crassus (Théry, 1905)
 Agrilus crataegi Frost, 1912
 Agrilus credulus Kerremans, 1897
 Agrilus crepuscularis Jendek & Chamorro, 2012
 Agrilus cribricollis Waterhouse, 1889
 Agrilus criddlei Frost, 1920
 Agrilus crinicornis Horn, 1891
 Agrilus cristianoi Curletti & Vayssières, 2007
 Agrilus croceivestis Marseul, 1866
 Agrilus croceovittatus Waterhouse, 1889
 Agrilus cruciatus Kerremans, 1912
 Agrilus crucifrons Kerremans, 1912
 Agrilus ctenias Théry, 1934
 Agrilus cteniasiformis Curletti & Sakalian, 2009
 Agrilus ctenocerus Gory, 1841
 Agrilus ctesias Kerremans, 1913
 Agrilus cucullus Obenberger, 1935
 Agrilus cuneatus Jendek in Jendek & Grebennikov, 2009
 Agrilus cuneiformis Deyrolle, 1864
 Agrilus cupai Gory, 1841
 Agrilus cupes Lewis, 1893
 Agrilus cupido Obenberger, 1924
 Agrilus cupidus Kerremans, 1897
 Agrilus cupratus Kerremans, 1900
 Agrilus cupreiceps Walker, 1859
 Agrilus cupreonitens Fisher, 1928
 Agrilus cupreoviolaceus Deyrolle, 1864
 Agrilus cuprescens (Ménétriés, 1832)
 Agrilus cuprescensellus Thomson, 1879
 Agrilus cupricauda Saunders, 1867
 Agrilus cuprifrons Deyrolle, 1864
 Agrilus cupripes Deyrolle, 1864
 Agrilus cupriventris Gory & Laporte, 1837
 Agrilus cuprosus Obenberger, 1923
 Agrilus curator Kerremans, 1903
 Agrilus curtulus Mulsant & Rey, 1863
 Agrilus curtus Fisher, 1930
 Agrilus curvicollis Moore, 1986
 Agrilus curvus Kerremans, 1899
 Agrilus cuspidatus Fåhraeus in Boheman, 1851
 Agrilus cuvieri Obenberger, 1933
 Agrilus cyaneofasciatus Théry, 1930
 Agrilus cyaneomicans Nonfried, 1892
 Agrilus cyaneoniger Saunders, 1873
 Agrilus cyaneovirens Bourgoin, 1922
 Agrilus cyanescens (Ratzeburg, 1837)
 Agrilus cyanicollis Deyrolle, 1864
 Agrilus cyanipennis Gory & Laporte, 1837
 Agrilus cyanopterus (Fabricius, 1801)
 Agrilus cygneus Abeille de Perrin, 1903
 Agrilus cylindratus Kerremans, 1896
 Agrilus cyphothoracoides Hespenheide in Westcott, et al., 2008
 Agrilus cypselus Curletti, 2006
 Agrilus cytisi Baudi di Selve, 1870
 Agrilus daccordii Curletti, 1997
 Agrilus daghestanicus Obenberger, 1930
 Agrilus dahoi Baudon, 1965
 Agrilus dahomeicus Kerremans, 1903
 Agrilus daillieri Baudon, 1965
 Agrilus daimio Obenberger, 1936
 Agrilus dali Jendek in Jendek & Grebennikov, 2009
 Agrilus dama Curletti, 2006
 Agrilus damoiselli Baudon, 1968
 Agrilus dampfi Fisher, 1933
 Agrilus danesi Obenberger, 1923
 Agrilus danglesae Baudon, 1968
 Agrilus dapitanensis Fisher, 1921
 Agrilus darjiling Jendek, 2001
 Agrilus dastaracae Descarpentries & Villiers, 1963
 Agrilus daubentoni Obenberger, 1933
 Agrilus dauberi Curletti, 2010
 Agrilus davidsoni Curletti, 1995
 Agrilus davisi Knull, 1941
 Agrilus deauratus Macleay, 1872
 Agrilus debakkeri Curletti, 2009
 Agrilus debilis Fåhraeus in Boheman, 1851
 Agrilus deborrei Dugès, 1891
 Agrilus decandolli Obenberger, 1933
 Agrilus decellei Pochon, 1972
 Agrilus decemnotatus Chevrolat, 1838
 Agrilus deceptor Kerremans, 1897
 Agrilus deceptorosus Obenberger, 1933
 Agrilus decimatus Obenberger, 1935
 Agrilus decoloratulus Obenberger, 1935
 Agrilus decoloratus Kerremans, 1892
 Agrilus decoratus Péringuey, 1908
 Agrilus decorsei (Théry, 1905)
 Agrilus decorus Kerremans, 1897
 Agrilus decupratus Curletti, 2001
 Agrilus defectus LeConte, 1860
 Agrilus deguchii Tôyama, 1985
 Agrilus dejeanii Thomson, 1879
 Agrilus delagoanus Obenberger, 1931
 Agrilus delchevi Curletti & Sakalian, 2009
 Agrilus delectabilis Waterhouse, 1889
 Agrilus delenitor Obenberger, 1935
 Agrilus deletus Kerremans, 1896
 Agrilus delicatulus Waterhouse, 1889
 Agrilus deliciosus Kerremans, 1897
 Agrilus delmastrellus Curletti & Vayssières, 2007
 Agrilus delmastroi Curletti, 2002
 Agrilus delphinensis Abeille de Perrin, 1897
 Agrilus delphinus Curletti, 2002
 Agrilus delphius Obenberger, 1924
 Agrilus demetrius Obenberger, 1924
 Agrilus demissus Kerremans, 1894
 Agrilus densetomentosus Obenberger, 1940
 Agrilus denticornis Chevrolat, 1867
 Agrilus denticulatus Waterhouse, 1889
 Agrilus dentifer Waterhouse, 1889
 Agrilus dentipennis Kerremans, 1899
 Agrilus dentipes Deyrolle, 1864
 Agrilus depressifrons Kerremans, 1900
 Agrilus depressus Kerremans, 1899
 Agrilus derasofasciatus Lacordaire in Boisduval & Lacordaire, 1835
 Agrilus derrisi Théry, 1930
 Agrilus desaegeri Curletti, 1997
 Agrilus desbosi Descarpentries & Villiers, 1963
 Agrilus descampsi Descarpentries & Villiers, 1963
 Agrilus descarpentriesi Bellamy, 1998
 Agrilus desertus (Klug, 1829)
 Agrilus desfontainesi Obenberger, 1933
 Agrilus desideratus Kerremans, 1897
 Agrilus desmaresti Obenberger, 1932
 Agrilus desuetus Kerremans, 1912
 Agrilus detractus Waterhouse, 1889
 Agrilus deuvei Baudon, 1965
 Agrilus devulsus Obenberger, 1935
 Agrilus dewetti Obenberger, 1933
 Agrilus deyrollei Kerremans, 1892
 Agrilus dhotmanae Curletti, 2000
 Agrilus diadema Deyrolle, 1864
 Agrilus diagoros Obenberger, 1933
 Agrilus diaguita Moore, 1985
 Agrilus dianthus Kerremans, 1892
 Agrilus diaolin Jendek, 2001
 Agrilus diaphanes Obenberger, 1932
 Agrilus dicalis Kerremans, 1903
 Agrilus dicax Kerremans, 1897
 Agrilus dichrous Kerremans, 1897
 Agrilus dietzi Fisher, 1938
 Agrilus differens Kerremans, 1896
 Agrilus difficilis Gory, 1841
 Agrilus dignus Kerremans, 1912
 Agrilus dilatefasciatus Obenberger, 1935
 Agrilus dilaticornis Kerremans, 1897
 Agrilus dilatipenis Jendek in Jendek & Grebennikov, 2009
 Agrilus dilatometatibialis Jendek, 1994
 Agrilus diligens Kerremans, 1912
 Agrilus dimidiatus Waterhouse, 1889
 Agrilus dimorphus Obenberger, 1923
 Agrilus dingo Curletti, 2001
 Agrilus dingoides Curletti & Aberlanc, 2010
 Agrilus diolaus Obenberger, 1958
 Agrilus dionides Thomson, 1879
 Agrilus dioscorides Obenberger, 1935
 Agrilus diospyroides Knull, 1942
 Agrilus dirus Kerremans, 1897
 Agrilus discalis Saunders, 1873
 Agrilus discicolliformis Obenberger, 1936
 Agrilus discicollis Deyrolle, 1864
 Agrilus discoidalis Waterhouse, 1889
 Agrilus discolor Fåhraeus in Boheman, 1851
 Agrilus discoloriformis Obenberger, 1920
 Agrilus discretus Théry, 1947
 Agrilus dispar Théry, 1947
 Agrilus disparifrons Curletti, 2010
 Agrilus dispersus Curletti, 2002
 Agrilus disponsae Baudon, 1968
 Agrilus dissimilis Waterhouse, 1889
 Agrilus distans Waterhouse, 1889
 Agrilus distinctus Deyrolle, 1864
 Agrilus divaricatus Waterhouse, 1889
 Agrilus divergens Thomson, 1878
 Agrilus diversicolor (Wallengren, 1881)
 Agrilus diversifrons Kerremans, 1899
 Agrilus diversornatus Jendek, 2011
 Agrilus diversus Waterhouse, 1889
 Agrilus dives Kerremans, 1897
 Agrilus docilis Kerremans, 1897
 Agrilus doddi Carter, 1924
 Agrilus dohrni Kerremans, 1900
 Agrilus dohrnianus Obenberger, 1933
 Agrilus doipui Jendek, 2007
 Agrilus dolatus Kerremans, 1897
 Agrilus dollii Schaeffer, 1904
 Agrilus dollmanni Obenberger, 1931
 Agrilus dolorosus Théry, 1947
 Agrilus dominicanus Thomson, 1878
 Agrilus dondeanus Obenberger, 1935
 Agrilus dorbignyi Saunders, 1871
 Agrilus dorsalis Deyrolle, 1864
 Agrilus dotatus Curletti, 2009
 Agrilus douglasi Obenberger, 1959
 Agrilus dozieri Fisher, 1918
 Agrilus drescheri Fisher, 1935
 Agrilus dromas Curletti, 1997
 Agrilus drumonti Curletti & Vayssières, 2007
 Agrilus dryadis Obenberger, 1932
 Agrilus dualae Obenberger, 1923
 Agrilus dualis Kerremans, 1903
 Agrilus dubius Kerremans, 1897
 Agrilus dubouai Descarpentries & Villiers, 1963
 Agrilus dudai Obenberger, 1932
 Agrilus dugesi Kerremans, 1897
 Agrilus dukuduku Curletti, 2004
 Agrilus duncani Knull, 1929
 Agrilus dunoyeri Baudon, 1968
 Agrilus duplicatus Kerremans, 1896
 Agrilus duporti Bourgoin, 1922
 Agrilus duttoi Curletti, 1997
 Agrilus duvivieri Kerremans, 1898
 Agrilus dysauxes Obenberger, 1933
 Agrilus ebersolti Curletti, 2000
 Agrilus ebolowae Obenberger, 1931
 Agrilus eburneopilosus Curletti, 2003
 Agrilus ecarinatus Marseul, 1866
 Agrilus echidna Curletti, 2001
 Agrilus echthreuon Obenberger, 1935
 Agrilus edeanus Obenberger, 1935
 Agrilus egeniformis Champlain & Knull, 1923
 Agrilus egenus Gory, 1841
 Agrilus eichelbaumi Kerremans, 1913
 Agrilus ekonae Obenberger, 1923
 Agrilus elaphrus Obenberger, 1933
 Agrilus eleanorae Fisher, 1928
 Agrilus electus Kerremans, 1897
 Agrilus elegans Mulsant & Rey, 1863
 Agrilus elegantulus (Waterhouse, 1889)
 Agrilus elenchon Obenberger, 1935
 Agrilus elimatus Obenberger, 1935
 Agrilus elongatissimus Kurosawa, 1981
 Agrilus elongatulus Gory & Laporte, 1837
 Agrilus emarginatus (Waterhouse, 1889)
 Agrilus embrikstrandellus Obenberger, 1935
 Agrilus emendatus Descarpentries & Villiers, 1963
 Agrilus emeritus Descarpentries & Villiers, 1963
 Agrilus eminens Descarpentries & Villiers, 1963
 Agrilus emmerichi Obenberger, 1935
 Agrilus empedus Obenberger, 1933
 Agrilus emu Curletti, 2001
 Agrilus encaustus Obenberger, 1924
 Agrilus endroedyi Curletti, 2000
 Agrilus enervatus Thomson, 1879
 Agrilus enriguei Murria Beltrán & Murria Beltrán, 2007
 Agrilus entomogastrinus Obenberger, 1935
 Agrilus epaulus Obenberger, 1932
 Agrilus ephialtes Obenberger, 1931
 Agrilus episcopus Curletti, 2003
 Agrilus epularis Obenberger, 1935
 Agrilus erbeni Obenberger, 1933
 Agrilus erbeniellus Obenberger, 1935
 Agrilus erici Curletti, 2010
 Agrilus erraticus Kerremans, 1900
 Agrilus ertli Kerremans, 1907
 Agrilus erythrostictus Bourgoin, 1922
 Agrilus esakii Kurosawa, 1964
 Agrilus escaleri Obenberger, 1921
 Agrilus esculentus Fisher, 1944
 Agrilus esperanzae Knull, 1935
 Agrilus ethlius Gory, 1841
 Agrilus eucerus Obenberger, 1935
 Agrilus eudaemon Obenberger, 1933
 Agrilus euglenes Obenberger, 1931
 Agrilus eukamosinus Obenberger, 1935
 Agrilus eulaxus Obenberger, 1932
 Agrilus euonymi Tôyama, 1985
 Agrilus eupalamus Gory, 1841
 Agrilus eupractus Obenberger, 1931
 Agrilus eurysaces Obenberger, 1947
 Agrilus eusternus Obenberger, 1935
 Agrilus eutyches Obenberger, 1932
 Agrilus evansiae Obenberger, 1933
 Agrilus evansianus Théry, 1934
 Agrilus evelinae Holynski, 1998
 Agrilus eversor Kerremans, 1903
 Agrilus evinadus Gory & Laporte, 1837
 Agrilus evolutus Descarpentries & Villiers, 1963
 Agrilus exageratus Obenberger, 1933
 Agrilus excisus Waterhouse, 1889
 Agrilus exclusus Obenberger, 1924
 Agrilus exiguellus Fisher, 1928
 Agrilus exilistis Strand, 1917
 Agrilus eximius Kerremans, 1897
 Agrilus exoletus Obenberger, 1935
 Agrilus expletus Kerremans, 1897
 Agrilus expolitus Kerremans, 1897
 Agrilus exsapindi Vogt, 1949
 Agrilus extraneus Fisher, 1933
 Agrilus extrarmatus Curletti, 2003
 Agrilus exustus Waterhouse, 1889
 Agrilus eyai Westcott & Noguera, 1995
 Agrilus faber Kerremans, 1897
 Agrilus fabricii Obenberger, 1933
 Agrilus faciatus Kerremans, 1903
 Agrilus faganae Curletti, 2005
 Agrilus fagniezi Obenberger, 1931
 Agrilus fahraei Saunders, 1871
 Agrilus fairmairei Kerremans, 1892
 Agrilus falaizei Baudon, 1968
 Agrilus falcatus (Klug, 1835)
 Agrilus fallaciosulus Obenberger, 1935
 Agrilus fallax Say, 1833
 Agrilus falli Fisher, 1928
 Agrilus famulus Kerremans, 1900
 Agrilus fareastensis Jendek, 1995
 Agrilus farinosus (Théry, 1905)
 Agrilus fartus Obenberger, 1935
 Agrilus fasattii Obenberger, 1959
 Agrilus fasciatellus Thomson, 1878
 Agrilus fasciohirtus Obenberger, 1935
 Agrilus fasciolatus Chevrolat, 1838
 Agrilus fasciosus Obenberger, 1935
 Agrilus fassatii Obenberger, 1959
 Agrilus fastidiosus Kerremans, 1896
 Agrilus fastigatus Kerremans, 1897
 Agrilus fauveli Kerremans, 1898
 Agrilus favieri Baudon, 1961
 Agrilus feae Kerremans, 1906
 Agrilus felix Horn, 1891
 Agrilus femoralis Waterhouse, 1889
 Agrilus fenestratus Curletti, 2003
 Agrilus ferrisi Dury, 1908
 Agrilus fertoni Obenberger, 1933
 Agrilus fevreae Descarpentries & Villiers, 1963
 Agrilus fidelis Kerremans, 1896
 Agrilus fidelissimus Obenberger, 1923
 Agrilus fidens Kerremans, 1903
 Agrilus filiformis Gory & Laporte, 1837
 Agrilus filigranus Obenberger, 1916
 Agrilus filiolus Obenberger, 1933
 Agrilus filius Bílý, Curletti & Van Harten, 2003
 Agrilus filonius Obenberger, 1933
 Agrilus filosellus Thomson, 1879
 Agrilus finellei Curletti & Vayssières, 2007
 Agrilus fisherellus Obenberger, 1936
 Agrilus fisherianus Knull, 1930
 Agrilus fissifrons Fairmaire, 1849
 Agrilus fissus Obenberger, 1917
 Agrilus flacourti (Théry, 1905)
 Agrilus flaveolus Gory & Laporte, 1837
 Agrilus flavoguttatus Waterhouse, 1889
 Agrilus fleischeri Obenberger, 1925
 Agrilus fleutiauxi Bourgoin, 1922
 Agrilus flohri (Waterhouse, 1890)
 Agrilus florentineae Baudon, 1964
 Agrilus floridanus Crotch, 1873
 Agrilus florilegus Obenberger, 1933
 Agrilus flosculus Obenberger, 1933
 Agrilus foliatus Jendek, 2007
 Agrilus foliicornis Abeille de Perrin, 1891
 Agrilus folognei Kerremans, 1912
 Agrilus fontanus Kerremans, 1914
 Agrilus formosanus Kerremans, 1912
 Agrilus forquerayi Baudon, 1968
 Agrilus forschhammeri Curletti, 1998
 Agrilus fortunatus Lewis, 1893
 Agrilus fosseicollis Thomson, 1879
 Agrilus fossiger Waterhouse, 1889
 Agrilus fossithorax Théry, 1955
 Agrilus fossulatus Waterhouse, 1889
 Agrilus fouqueae Descarpentries & Villiers, 1963
 Agrilus fouqueti Bourgoin, 1922
 Agrilus fragilis Kerremans, 1893
 Agrilus franciusi Descarpentries & Villiers, 1963
 Agrilus francotassii Curletti, 2000
 Agrilus francottei Curletti, 1997
 Agrilus fraternus Dugès, 1891
 Agrilus fraudatorellus Thomson, 1879
 Agrilus fraudulentus Péringuey, 1908
 Agrilus frenchi Blackburn, 1891
 Agrilus frequens Curletti & Dutto, 1999
 Agrilus frerensis Obenberger, 1935
 Agrilus friebi Obenberger, 1922
 Agrilus friesei Obenberger, 1932
 Agrilus frigidinus Obenberger, 1932
 Agrilus frigidus Gory, 1841
 Agrilus frontalis Gory & Laporte, 1837
 Agrilus frosti Knull, 1920
 Agrilus frustrator Kerremans, 1900
 Agrilus frustrinus Obenberger, 1935
 Agrilus fryi Obenberger, 1931
 Agrilus fucatus Obenberger, 1935
 Agrilus fugax Kerremans, 1894
 Agrilus fugitivus Kerremans, 1896
 Agrilus fulgens LeConte, 1860
 Agrilus fulgidiceps Motschulsky, 1861
 Agrilus fulvolineatus Kerremans, 1903
 Agrilus fulvopictus Kerremans, 1896
 Agrilus fulvovittatus Fisher, 1921
 Agrilus funebris Deyrolle, 1864
 Agrilus funestus Gory, 1841
 Agrilus furcatipennis Gory & Laporte, 1837
 Agrilus furcillatus Chevrolat, 1834
 Agrilus furiosus Obenberger, 1935
 Agrilus fuscipennis Gory, 1841
 Agrilus fuscus Hespenheide, 1990
 Agrilus fusus Curletti, 2006
 Agrilus gabonensis Curletti, 2003
 Agrilus gagneuxi Baudon, 1968
 Agrilus galiberti Obenberger, 1931
 Agrilus ganglbaueri Semenov, 1891
 Agrilus gaoligong Jendek, 2000
 Agrilus gardneri Théry, 1929
 Agrilus garrulus Kerremans, 1903
 Agrilus gaudens Kerremans, 1897
 Agrilus gayeli Curletti, 2006
 Agrilus gazzellus Curletti & Dutto, 1999
 Agrilus gebhardti Obenberger, 1935
 Agrilus gebleri Obenberger, 1924
 Agrilus gedeanus Obenberger, 1931
 Agrilus gedeellus Novak & Curletti, 2008
 Agrilus gedenus Novak & Curletti, 2008
 Agrilus gedyei Théry, 1941
 Agrilus geminatus (Say, 1823)
 Agrilus generosus Kerremans, 1896
 Agrilus genseae Baudon, 1960
 Agrilus gentilis Deyrolle, 1864
 Agrilus geoffroyi Obenberger, 1933
 Agrilus georgesi Baudon, 1968
 Agrilus geraudi Bourgoin, 1925
 Agrilus geronimoi Knull, 1950
 Agrilus gerschuni Stepanov, 1958
 Agrilus gestroi Kerremans, 1906
 Agrilus gianassoi Magnani & Niehuis, 1994
 Agrilus gianfrancoi Bellamy, 2004
 Agrilus gianlucai Curletti, 1997
 Agrilus gibbicollis Fall, 1901
 Agrilus gibbifrons (Waterhouse, 1889)
 Agrilus gibbosus Kerremans, 1899
 Agrilus giesberti Hespenheide in Hespenheide & Bellamy, 2009
 Agrilus giglii Curletti, 2002
 Agrilus gileti Obenberger, 1933
 Agrilus gillespiensis Knull, 1947
 Agrilus giloloensis Saunders, 1871
 Agrilus gilvopictus Kerremans, 1897
 Agrilus giorgiae Curletti, 2004
 Agrilus giraffa Curletti, 2006
 Agrilus giraudi Baudon, 1965
 Agrilus giubbicola Obenberger, 1940
 Agrilus glabratus Waterhouse, 1889
 Agrilus glebae Curletti, 2010
 Agrilus globulifrons Obenberger, 1920
 Agrilus gloriosulus Péringuey, 1908
 Agrilus goergeni Curletti & Vayssières, 2007
 Agrilus goichetae Baudon, 1965
 Agrilus goldsteini Curletti, 2010
 Agrilus golettoi Curletti, 1997
 Agrilus goodi Curletti, 1995
 Agrilus gorai Fisher, 1925
 Agrilus gordoni Curletti & Sakalian, 2009
 Agrilus goryellus Thomson, 1879
 Agrilus goryi Saunders, 1871
 Agrilus gounellei Kerremans, 1897
 Agrilus gouyei Baudon, 1965
 Agrilus goyaz Bellamy, 1998
 Agrilus gracchus Obenberger, 1935
 Agrilus graciae Obenberger, 1932
 Agrilus gracilipes Waterhouse, 1889
 Agrilus gracilis Deyrolle, 1864
 Agrilus gracilitarsis Waterhouse, 1889
 Agrilus graecus Obenberger, 1916
 Agrilus grallus Curletti, 2002
 Agrilus graminis Kiesenwetter, 1857
 Agrilus grandiceps Kiesenwetter, 1857
 Agrilus grandinatus Curletti, 2010
 Agrilus grandis Gory & Laporte, 1837
 Agrilus granulatus (Say, 1823)
 Agrilus granulicollis Gory & Laporte, 1837
 Agrilus granulosus Gory & Laporte, 1837
 Agrilus graptelytrus Obenberger, 1914
 Agrilus gratiosulus (Obenberger, 1932)
 Agrilus gratiosus Deyrolle, 1864
 Agrilus gratus Kerremans, 1899
 Agrilus graueri Kerremans, 1914
 Agrilus gravedinosus Obenberger, 1935
 Agrilus gravenhorsti Obenberger, 1935
 Agrilus gregori Obenberger, 1936
 Agrilus gressitti Curletti, 2006
 Agrilus grilloi Obenberger, 1933
 Agrilus grisator Kerremans, 1893
 Agrilus griseoniger Hespenheide, 1990
 Agrilus griseonotatus Kerremans, 1899
 Agrilus griseopictus Kerremans, 1898
 Agrilus grisescens Deyrolle, 1864
 Agrilus grobbelaarae Curletti, 2000
 Agrilus grobleri Curletti, 2000
 Agrilus grouvellei Kerremans, 1896
 Agrilus grusinus Obenberger, 1917
 Agrilus guarani Obenberger, 1933
 Agrilus gueorguievi Curletti & Sakalian, 2009
 Agrilus guercyi Obenberger, 1933
 Agrilus guerinii Lacordaire in Boisduval & Lacordaire, 1835
 Agrilus gumia Obenberger, 1935
 Agrilus guningi Kerremans, 1911
 Agrilus gunjii Tôyama, 1987
 Agrilus gussakovskiji Alexeev, 1981
 Agrilus guttifer Kerremans, 1900
 Agrilus guttulatus Deyrolle, 1864
 Agrilus gyleki Obenberger, 1917
 Agrilus gyllenhalius Obenberger, 1933
 Agrilus haafi Curletti, 2002
 Agrilus habilis Kerremans, 1903
 Agrilus haenkei Obenberger, 1932
 Agrilus haesitans Curletti, 2002
 Agrilus hallei Curletti, 2000
 Agrilus haniquei Baudon, 1965
 Agrilus hansi Obenberger, 1933
 Agrilus harenus Nelson, 1994
 Agrilus harlequin Obenberger, 1924
 Agrilus harmodius Obenberger, 1935
 Agrilus harpagon Obenberger, 1931
 Agrilus hartebeestensis Obenberger, 1939
 Agrilus hasegawai Kurosawa, 1954
 Agrilus hassani Théry, 1930
 Agrilus hastulatus Fåhraeus in Boheman, 1851
 Agrilus hastulifer (Ratzeburg, 1837)
 Agrilus hastuliformis Novak, 2003
 Agrilus hattorii Nakane, 1983
 Agrilus haucki Jendek in Jendek & Grebennikov, 2009
 Agrilus hayekae Descarpentries & Villiers, 1963
 Agrilus hazardi Knull, 1966
 Agrilus hectori Curletti, 2005
 Agrilus hehe Curletti & Dutto, 1999
 Agrilus henroti Descarpentries & Villiers, 1963
 Agrilus herostratus Obenberger, 1935
 Agrilus hespenheidei Nelson in Nelson & Westcott, 1991
 Agrilus hesperus Kerremans, 1897
 Agrilus heterothecae Knull, 1972
 Agrilus hexacanthus Obenberger, 1935
 Agrilus hexaspilotus Descarpentries & Villiers, 1963
 Agrilus hexaspinus Obenberger, 1923
 Agrilus hexastigmus Bourgoin, 1925
 Agrilus heyrovskyanus Obenberger, 1935
 Agrilus hiatus Jendek, 2007
 Agrilus hibisci Montrouzier, 1855
 Agrilus hiekei Curletti, 1994
 Agrilus hieroglyphicus Kerremans, 1899
 Agrilus hilaris Waterhouse, 1889
 Agrilus hildebrandti Harold, 1878
 Agrilus hinnulus Obenberger, 1933
 Agrilus hintoni Fisher, 1933
 Agrilus hirashimai Kurosawa, 1964
 Agrilus hirsutulus Deyrolle, 1864
 Agrilus hispaniolae Hespenheide, 1998
 Agrilus histrio Kerremans, 1914
 Agrilus hittita Magnani, 1996
 Agrilus hobsoni Baudon, 1968
 Agrilus holubiellus Obenberger, 1939
 Agrilus holynskii Curletti, 1997
 Agrilus holzschuhi Jendek, 1994
 Agrilus homocletes Obenberger, 1933
 Agrilus honestus Kerremans, 1896
 Agrilus honorius Obenberger, 1933
 Agrilus horaki Jendek, 2000
 Agrilus hornburgi Jendek, 2007
 Agrilus horni Kerremans, 1900
 Agrilus hornianus Kerremans, 1912
 Agrilus horniellus Obenberger, 1935
 Agrilus hortator Obenberger, 1924
 Agrilus hoschekanus Obenberger, 1933
 Agrilus hoscheki Obenberger, 1916
 Agrilus hostia Fisher, 1944
 Agrilus howanus Obenberger, 1935
 Agrilus howdenae Curletti, 2000
 Agrilus howdeni Knull, 1957
 Agrilus howdenorum Hespenheide, 2008
 Agrilus huachucae Schaeffer, 1905
 Agrilus hualpaii Knull, 1939
 Agrilus huascar Obenberger, 1932
 Agrilus huashanus Jendek, 2001
 Agrilus humboldti Obenberger, 1933
 Agrilus humerosus Fairmaire, 1850
 Agrilus humilis Kerremans, 1895
 Agrilus hunanus Jendek in Jendek & Grebennikov, 2009
 Agrilus hybridus Curletti, 2003
 Agrilus hylaeae Obenberger, 1935
 Agrilus hypatus Obenberger, 1933
 Agrilus hyperici (Creutzer, 1799) — St. John's wort root borer
 Agrilus hypericicola Abeille de Perrin, 1893
 Agrilus hypochoreon Obenberger, 1933
 Agrilus hypocritus Deyrolle, 1864
 Agrilus hypoianthus Obenberger, 1935
 Agrilus hypoleucus Gory & Laporte, 1837
 Agrilus iablokoffi Descarpentries & Villiers, 1963
 Agrilus iaotli Fisher, 1938
 Agrilus ibericus Sánchez & Tolosa, 2005
 Agrilus ibiscanus Curletti, 2007
 Agrilus ichikoae Tôyama, 1987
 Agrilus ichthyocerus (Perty, 1830)
 Agrilus idas Obenberger, 1935
 Agrilus idoneus Kerremans, 1903
 Agrilus ieiunulus Obenberger, 1936
 Agrilus ignarus Kerremans, 1897
 Agrilus ignavus Kerremans, 1897
 Agrilus igneosignatus Dugès, 1891
 Agrilus ignicaudatellus Thomson, 1878
 Agrilus ignifrons Deyrolle, 1864
 Agrilus ignipennis Lucas, 1857
 Agrilus ignotus Waterhouse, 1889
 Agrilus iliganensis Fisher, 1921
 Agrilus illectus Fall, 1901
 Agrilus illibatus Kerremans, 1903
 Agrilus imasakai Tôyama, 1985
 Agrilus imbellis Crotch, 1873
 Agrilus imbricatus Gory, 1841
 Agrilus imitans Lewis, 1893
 Agrilus imitator Obenberger, 1933
 Agrilus immaculatellus Thomson, 1879
 Agrilus immaculatus Fisher, 1921
 Agrilus immaculicollis Thomson, 1878
 Agrilus immaculifrons Waterhouse, 1889
 Agrilus immsi Obenberger, 1933
 Agrilus impar Kerremans, 1897
 Agrilus impexus Horn, 1891
 Agrilus impopularis Deyrolle, 1864
 Agrilus importunus Kerremans, 1903
 Agrilus impressicollis Gory, 1841
 Agrilus impressipennis Thomson, 1879
 Agrilus impudens Kerremans, 1897
 Agrilus inachus Obenberger, 1935
 Agrilus inadai Fukutomi, 2006
 Agrilus inaequalis Waterhouse, 1889
 Agrilus inamoenus Kerremans, 1892
 Agrilus incerticolor Deyrolle, 1864
 Agrilus incertus Chevrolat, 1835
 Agrilus inclinatus Waterhouse, 1889
 Agrilus incompositus Curletti, 2003
 Agrilus incongruellus Obenberger, 1935
 Agrilus inconstans (Théry, 1905)
 Agrilus incredulus Curletti, 2005
 Agrilus indagator Kerremans, 1900
 Agrilus indigaceus Deyrolle, 1864
 Agrilus indiges Obenberger, 1935
 Agrilus indignus Fairmaire, 1849
 Agrilus indocilis Obenberger, 1931
 Agrilus indulgens Kerremans, 1897
 Agrilus ineditus Chevrolat, 1838
 Agrilus ineptus Kerremans, 1892
 Agrilus inermis Fisher, 1921
 Agrilus inexpectatus Novak & Curletti, 2007
 Agrilus infelix Gory, 1841
 Agrilus infimus Kerremans, 1899
 Agrilus inflatus Kerremans, 1897
 Agrilus infuscatus Kerremans, 1897
 Agrilus ingae Curletti, 2005
 Agrilus inhabilis Kerremans, 1900
 Agrilus iniudicatus Curletti, 1998
 Agrilus innotatus Fisher, 1921
 Agrilus inops Kerremans, 1892
 Agrilus inornatulus Obenberger, 1935
 Agrilus inornatus Kerremans, 1896
 Agrilus inquinatus Saunders, 1874
 Agrilus insidiosus Kerremans, 1896
 Agrilus insipidus Deyrolle, 1864
 Agrilus insolitus Curletti, 2002
 Agrilus insularis Deyrolle, 1864
 Agrilus insulicolus Kerremans, 1912
 Agrilus insuperatus Descarpentries & Villiers, 1963
 Agrilus integerrimus (Ratzeburg, 1837)
 Agrilus integrus Curletti & Dutto, 1999
 Agrilus intermedius Kerremans, 1897
 Agrilus interstitialis Hespenheide & Westcott, 2011
 Agrilus intrusulus Obenberger, 1935
 Agrilus intrusus Kerremans, 1914
 Agrilus invectus Curletti & Dutto, 1999
 Agrilus iracundus Curletti, 1995
 Agrilus iriei Tôyama, 1985
 Agrilus irregularis Kerremans, 1899
 Agrilus irreprehensus Obenberger, 1931
 Agrilus irrequietus Thomson, 1879
 Agrilus irritator Obenberger, 1936
 Agrilus irrorellus Harold, 1869
 Agrilus irruptus Obenberger, 1931
 Agrilus iruwimensis Obenberger, 1936
 Agrilus isabellae Obenberger, 1921
 Agrilus isoberliniae Curletti & Vayssières, 2007
 Agrilus iucundus Curletti, 2003
 Agrilus ivetteae Curletti, 2010
 Agrilus ixcuinae Fisher, 1938
 Agrilus jacetanus Sánchez & Tolosa, 2004
 Agrilus jacobinus Horn, 1891
 Agrilus jacobsoni Fisher, 1926
 Agrilus jadwigae Holynski, 1998
 Agrilus jamaicensis Hespenheide, 1998
 Agrilus jaminae Baudon, 1968
 Agrilus japanocarinatus Ohmomo, 2002
 Agrilus japyx Obenberger, 1935
 Agrilus jarbas Obenberger, 1935
 Agrilus jarrensis Baudon, 1968
 Agrilus jarrigei Descarpentries & Villiers, 1963
 Agrilus jasius Obenberger, 1935
 Agrilus javicolus Fisher, 1935
 Agrilus jeanneli Kerremans, 1914
 Agrilus jedlickai Obenberger, 1931
 Agrilus jejunus Obenberger, 1933
 Agrilus jemjemensis Théry, 1937
 Agrilus jenningsi Fisher, 1938
 Agrilus jiloi Curletti & Sakalian, 2009
 Agrilus jobi Baudon, 1968
 Agrilus josei Obenberger, 1935
 Agrilus joukli Obenberger, 1931
 Agrilus juglandis Knull, 1920
 Agrilus jugurtha Abeille de Perrin, 1900
 Agrilus julius Obenberger, 1933
 Agrilus jumbo Curletti, 2002
 Agrilus junceus (Pallas, 1781)
 Agrilus jussieui Obenberger, 1933
 Agrilus juxtasuturalis Abeille de Perrin, 1897
 Agrilus kackovskii Obenberger, 1935
 Agrilus kalamboinus Obenberger, 1935
 Agrilus kalshoveni Obenberger, 1931
 Agrilus kaluganus Obenberger, 1940
 Agrilus kandaricus Gestro, 1877
 Agrilus kandyanus Théry, 1904
 Agrilus kangaroo Curletti, 2001
 Agrilus kanssuanus Obenberger, 1930
 Agrilus karakae Fisher, 1936
 Agrilus karrooi Curletti, 2000
 Agrilus kashituensis Obenberger, 1935
 Agrilus kassaigena Obenberger, 1931
 Agrilus kaszabi Pochon, 1967
 Agrilus kawarai Kurosawa, 1963
 Agrilus kedahae Fisher, 1930
 Agrilus kedirianus Obenberger, 1931
 Agrilus kenge Curletti & Dutto, 1999
 Agrilus kenniah Fisher, 1930
 Agrilus kerremansellus Obenberger, 1935
 Agrilus kerremansi Dugès, 1891
 Agrilus kettneri Curletti & van Harten, 2004
 Agrilus keyensis Kerremans, 1894
 Agrilus kheili Obenberger, 1924
 Agrilus kiloanus Obenberger, 1935
 Agrilus kindianus Curletti, 1995
 Agrilus kinuthiae Curletti & Sakalian, 2009
 Agrilus kirbyi Obenberger, 1933
 Agrilus klapperichianus Cobos, 1966
 Agrilus klugianus Obenberger, 1933
 Agrilus knabi Fisher, 1938
 Agrilus koala Curletti, 2001
 Agrilus kobayashii Tôyama, 1987
 Agrilus kocheri Baudon, 1956
 Agrilus kokaburra Curletti, 2001
 Agrilus kolleri Kerremans, 1912
 Agrilus komareki Obenberger, 1926
 Agrilus korenskyi Obenberger, 1923
 Agrilus kormilevi Bílý, 1975
 Agrilus korsakovi Obenberger, 1935
 Agrilus koshantshikovi Obenberger, 1933
 Agrilus kostali Jendek, 2007
 Agrilus kotoensis Miwa & Chûjô, 1940
 Agrilus koyoi Ohmomo, 2002
 Agrilus kraatzi Kerremans, 1899
 Agrilus krantzi Kerremans, 1911
 Agrilus kratochvili Obenberger, 1936
 Agrilus kuangcenensis Obenberger, 1940
 Agrilus kubani Bílý, 1991
 Agrilus kuchingensis Tôyama, 1987
 Agrilus kudatensis Fisher, 1930
 Agrilus kudunguruus Obenberger, 1935
 Agrilus kurandae Obenberger, 1923
 Agrilus kurumi Kurosawa, 1957
 Agrilus kusakievici Obenberger, 1936
 Agrilus kutahyanus Królik, 2002
 Agrilus kuznecovi Obenberger, 1933
 Agrilus lacordairei Gory & Laporte, 1837
 Agrilus lacroixi Obenberger, 1936
 Agrilus lacus Curletti & Ponel, 1994
 Agrilus lacustris LeConte, 1860
 Agrilus laelius Obenberger, 1935
 Agrilus laetabilis Kerremans, 1897
 Agrilus laetecyanescens Obenberger, 1940
 Agrilus laetifrons Mannerheim, 1837
 Agrilus laetitius Obenberger, 1935
 Agrilus laetulus Waterhouse, 1889
 Agrilus laetus Waterhouse, 1889
 Agrilus laevifrons Kerremans, 1900
 Agrilus laevipennis Waterhouse, 1889
 Agrilus laeviventris Kerremans, 1900
 Agrilus lafertei Kerremans, 1892
 Agrilus lagosinus Obenberger, 1931
 Agrilus lamarcki Obenberger, 1933
 Agrilus lameerei Kerremans, 1912
 Agrilus lancifer Deyrolle, 1864
 Agrilus lancrenonae Baudon, 1968
 Agrilus lancrenoni Baudon, 1965
 Agrilus langei Obenberger, 1935
 Agrilus langkasukae Fisher, 1933
 Agrilus languens Kerremans, 1903
 Agrilus languidus Chevrolat, 1838
 Agrilus lanzarotensis Cobos, 1969
 Agrilus laomedon Obenberger, 1932
 Agrilus lasiosurus Obenberger, 1935
 Agrilus laterimaculatus Hespenheide, 1990
 Agrilus latevittatus (Waterhouse, 1889)
 Agrilus laticaudatus Waterhouse, 1889
 Agrilus laticeps Waterhouse, 1889
 Agrilus laticornis (Illiger, 1803)
 Agrilus latifrons Waterhouse, 1889
 Agrilus latipalpis Jendek, 2007
 Agrilus laudabilis Kerremans, 1897
 Agrilus laurenconi Descarpentries & Villiers, 1963
 Agrilus lautuelliformis Hespenheide, 1990
 Agrilus lautuellus Fisher, 1928
 Agrilus lautus Kerremans, 1899
 Agrilus lavillei Obenberger, 1932
 Agrilus lavoisieri Obenberger, 1933
 Agrilus lazar Obenberger, 1924
 Agrilus lebisi Descarpentries & Villiers, 1963
 Agrilus lecontei Saunders, 1871
 Agrilus legatus Obenberger, 1936
 Agrilus legrosi Descarpentries & Villiers, 1963
 Agrilus leguayi Baudon, 1965
 Agrilus legwai Bellamy, 1998
 Agrilus lejeunei Baudon, 1965
 Agrilus leleupi Curletti, 1997
 Agrilus leminus Obenberger, 1932
 Agrilus lemur Obenberger, 1936
 Agrilus lentulus Waterhouse, 1889
 Agrilus leonhardi Kerremans, 1913
 Agrilus lepineyi Théry, 1934
 Agrilus leprieuri Pic, 1918
 Agrilus lesapinus Obenberger, 1935
 Agrilus lesnei Théry, 1934
 Agrilus lessei Descarpentries & Villiers, 1963
 Agrilus lestageanus Obenberger, 1935
 Agrilus lestagei Théry, 1930
 Agrilus letellierae Descarpentries & Villiers, 1963
 Agrilus leucaenae Hespenheide in Hespenheide & Bellamy, 2009
 Agrilus levasseuri Descarpentries & Villiers, 1963
 Agrilus leveyi Curletti, 1998
 Agrilus levifrons Kerremans, 1900
 Agrilus levuensis Théry, 1937
 Agrilus licheti Baudon, 1968
 Agrilus likoniensis Obenberger, 1928
 Agrilus limnophilus Curletti, 1997
 Agrilus limoniastri Bedel, 1886
 Agrilus limpiae Knull, 1941
 Agrilus limpopoensis Obenberger, 1935
 Agrilus limvuanus Kerremans, 1898
 Agrilus lindryi Baudon, 1968
 Agrilus lineariformis Jendek, 2005
 Agrilus lineatomaculatus Jendek, 1994
 Agrilus lineellus Gory, 1841
 Agrilus lineola Kiesenwetter, 1857
 Agrilus linnei Obenberger, 1933
 Agrilus liscapia Jendek, 2003
 Agrilus listreuon Obenberger, 1935
 Agrilus lithocarpi Curletti, 2006
 Agrilus litura Kiesenwetter, 1857
 Agrilus lituratus (Klug, 1829)
 Agrilus livens Kerremans, 1892
 Agrilus ljubomirovi Curletti & Sakalian, 2009
 Agrilus llanero Obenberger, 1933
 Agrilus lloydae Baudon, 1968
 Agrilus lloydi (Théry, 1940)
 Agrilus loangensis Obenberger, 1931
 Agrilus loesthus Obenberger, 1935
 Agrilus longicollis Saunders, 1866
 Agrilus longicornis Curletti, 2009
 Agrilus longicornis Gory & Laporte, 1837
 Agrilus longiusculus Gory & Laporte, 1837
 Agrilus loosdregti Baudon, 1965
 Agrilus lopatini Alexeev, 1964
 Agrilus lopus Obenberger, 1935
 Agrilus loretanus Obenberger, 1933
 Agrilus loupyi Baudon, 1968
 Agrilus lubischevi Stepanov, 1958
 Agrilus lubopetri Jendek, 2000
 Agrilus lucanus Fall, 1906
 Agrilus lucens Kerremans, 1897
 Agrilus lucidicollis Gory, 1841
 Agrilus lucificus Descarpentries & Villiers, 1963
 Agrilus lucindae Hespenheide, 2010
 Agrilus luctator Kerremans, 1903
 Agrilus luctuosellus Obenberger, 1924
 Agrilus luctuosus Kerremans, 1897
 Agrilus luculentus Kerremans, 1900
 Agrilus lucullus Obenberger, 1935
 Agrilus ludificator Obenberger, 1924
 Agrilus luebanus Obenberger, 1931
 Agrilus luederwaldti Obenberger, 1933
 Agrilus lugovoi Stepanov, 1958
 Agrilus lugubris Kerremans, 1914
 Agrilus lukesi Obenberger, 1936
 Agrilus lukuledianus Kerremans, 1907
 Agrilus lunidorsatus Kerremans, 1913
 Agrilus lusinganus Curletti, 1997
 Agrilus luteopictus Obenberger, 1931
 Agrilus lycaon Obenberger, 1933
 Agrilus maai Curletti, 2006
 Agrilus mabokeanus Curletti, 1998
 Agrilus macellus Bourgoin, 1922
 Agrilus macer LeConte, 1858
 Agrilus machaon Obenberger, 1935
 Agrilus machnovskii Stepanov, 1958
 Agrilus machulkai Obenberger, 1935
 Agrilus macillentus Obenberger, 1924
 Agrilus macleayi Carter, 1924
 Agrilus macrocephalus Curletti, 2006
 Agrilus macroderus Abeille de Perrin, 1897
 Agrilus macrotatopus Obenberger, 1930
 Agrilus maculatus Gory & Laporte, 1837
 Agrilus maculicollis Gory & Laporte, 1837
 Agrilus maculifer Saunders, 1873
 Agrilus maculifrons Gory, 1841
 Agrilus maculipennis Kerremans, 1900
 Agrilus maculisternis Obenberger, 1932
 Agrilus maculiventris Deyrolle, 1864
 Agrilus madanensis Jendek in Jendek & Grebennikov, 2009
 Agrilus maddalenae Curletti, 1998
 Agrilus madecassus (Fairmaire, 1898)
 Agrilus madeci Baudon, 1968
 Agrilus madegassus Obenberger, 1935
 Agrilus maderi Obenberger, 1932
 Agrilus maesi Curletti, 2011
 Agrilus major Waterhouse, 1889
 Agrilus majzlani Jendek, 2007
 Agrilus makiharai Tôyama, 1987
 Agrilus makiharaiellus Ohmomo, 2006
 Agrilus makonde Curletti, 2002
 Agrilus malasicus Fisher, 1930
 Agrilus malaspinai Curletti & Dutto, 1999
 Agrilus malayanus Obenberger, 1924
 Agrilus maledictus Théry, 1927
 Agrilus mali Matsumura, 1924
 Agrilus malicola Rungs & Schaefer, 1948
 Agrilus malinaoensis Fisher, 1921
 Agrilus malloti Théry, 1930
 Agrilus mallotiellus Kurosawa, 1985
 Agrilus malus Kerremans, 1899
 Agrilus malvastri Fisher, 1928
 Agrilus malyi Obenberger, 1936
 Agrilus manaosensis Obenberger, 1933
 Agrilus manatus Waterhouse, 1889
 Agrilus mancus Obenberger, 1931
 Agrilus mandaricus Kerremans, 1892
 Agrilus mandatus Kerremans, 1913
 Agrilus mandingo Curletti, 1996
 Agrilus mandubius Obenberger, 1935
 Agrilus manilensis Fisher, 1921
 Agrilus manius Obenberger, 1935
 Agrilus manni Fisher, 1925
 Agrilus mannianus Théry, 1937
 Agrilus mansuetus Thomson, 1879
 Agrilus maquilingensis Fisher, 1921
 Agrilus marcens Obenberger, 1935
 Agrilus marginatus Waterhouse, 1889
 Agrilus marginicollis Saunders, 1873
 Agrilus margotanae Novak, 2001
 Agrilus marietae Curletti & Sakalian, 2007
 Agrilus marmoreus  Deyrolle, 1864
 Agrilus marozzinii Gobbi, 1974
 Agrilus marreae Descarpentries & Villiers, 1963
 Agrilus marreli Curletti, 2000
 Agrilus masculinus Horn, 1891
 Agrilus mashukulumbo Obenberger, 1936
 Agrilus mashunus Péringuey, 1908
 Agrilus massanensis Schaefer, 1955
 Agrilus massikessus Obenberger, 1935
 Agrilus mastersii Macleay, 1872
 Agrilus matacottai Curletti & Dutto, 1999
 Agrilus mathabathei Bellamy, 1998
 Agrilus mathani Obenberger, 1935
 Agrilus matho Obenberger, 1933
 Agrilus matoposinus Curletti, 2002
 Agrilus matsudai Tôyama, 1987
 Agrilus mawambinus Obenberger, 1935
 Agrilus mayeti Théry, 1912
 Agrilus maynaei Kerremans, 1912
 Agrilus mayumbinus Obenberger, 1935
 Agrilus mcgregori Fisher, 1926
 Agrilus mecoatli Fisher, 1938
 Agrilus mediocris Kerremans, 1900
 Agrilus medius Kerremans, 1900
 Agrilus megerlei Fisher, 1933
 Agrilus melanarius Deyrolle, 1864
 Agrilus melancholicus Kerremans, 1897
 Agrilus melanocerus Curletti, 2005
 Agrilus melanolucidus Ohmomo, 2005
 Agrilus melanosoma Obenberger, 1935
 Agrilus melanospilus Hespenheide, 1990
 Agrilus melas Kerremans, 1896
 Agrilus meleager Obenberger, 1935
 Agrilus meliboeformis Descarpentries & Villiers, 1967
 Agrilus meloni Curletti, 1986
 Agrilus mendax Mannerheim, 1837
 Agrilus mendicus Fåhraeus in Boheman, 1851
 Agrilus mentor Kerremans, 1912
 Agrilus mephistinus Obenberger, 1935
 Agrilus meracus Kerremans, 1897
 Agrilus mercurini Théry, 1930
 Agrilus messorius Kerremans, 1903
 Agrilus metallescens Dugès, 1891
 Agrilus methneri Curletti, 2002
 Agrilus meticulosus Deyrolle, 1864
 Agrilus metropolitanus Curletti, 2005
 Agrilus metuens Kerremans, 1903
 Agrilus mexicanus Gory, 1841
 Agrilus michielsi Curletti, 2009
 Agrilus micro Curletti, 2000
 Agrilus micromegas Obenberger, 1924
 Agrilus microtatus Obenberger, 1924
 Agrilus mikusiakorum Jendek, 2004
 Agrilus milletae Baudon, 1968
 Agrilus milleti Baudon, 1968
 Agrilus milo Obenberger, 1936
 Agrilus mimnermus Obenberger, 1936
 Agrilus mimosae Fisher, 1928
 Agrilus mindanaoensis Fisher, 1921
 Agrilus minimus Bellamy, 1998
 Agrilus minor Deyrolle, 1864
 Agrilus minos Deyrolle, 1864
 Agrilus minusculus Marseul, 1866
 Agrilus minutulus Obenberger, 1936
 Agrilus minutus Harold, 1869
 Agrilus mirabiliformis Obenberger, 1924
 Agrilus mirandus Obenberger, 1935
 Agrilus mirei Descarpentries & Villiers, 1963
 Agrilus miron Obenberger, 1933
 Agrilus mirus Curletti, 2002
 Agrilus miserabilis Deyrolle, 1864
 Agrilus missai Curletti, 2003
 Agrilus missanus Curletti, 2006
 Agrilus missionum Obenberger, 1947
 Agrilus miwai Obenberger, 1936
 Agrilus mixtus Kerremans, 1892
 Agrilus mjoebergi Gebhardt, 1925
 Agrilus mlanjensis Obenberger, 1935
 Agrilus mocquerysi (Théry, 1905)
 Agrilus modestus Gory & Laporte, 1837
 Agrilus modicus Kerremans, 1892
 Agrilus modiglianii Kerremans, 1894
 Agrilus moerens Saunders, 1873
 Agrilus mogadoricus Escalera, 1914
 Agrilus mole Curletti, 2002
 Agrilus molestus Waterhouse, 1889
 Agrilus molirensis Kerremans, 1898
 Agrilus molitor Abeille de Perrin, 1897
 Agrilus moloch Curletti, 2001
 Agrilus molochitis Curletti, 2008
 Agrilus mombassicus Obenberger, 1931
 Agrilus mongolorum Obenberger, 1936
 Agrilus monogrammus Thomson, 1879
 Agrilus monotonus Thomson, 1879
 Agrilus monteithi Curletti, 2008
 Agrilus montezuma Fisher, 1933
 Agrilus monticola Kerremans, 1906
 Agrilus montosae Barr, 2008
 Agrilus morawitzi Obenberger, 1936
 Agrilus morelae Baudon, 1968
 Agrilus moreli Baudon, 1968
 Agrilus morio Kerremans, 1895
 Agrilus moriscus Obenberger, 1913
 Agrilus morobensis Curletti, 2006
 Agrilus morrissae Baudon, 1965
 Agrilus morus Curletti, 1995
 Agrilus motobuanus Fukutomi, 2006
 Agrilus motoinus Obenberger, 1935
 Agrilus motschulskyi Théry, 1904
 Agrilus moultoni Kerremans, 1912
 Agrilus mourgliai Curletti, 1997
 Agrilus mouricouae Baudon, 1965
 Agrilus mrazi (Obenberger, 1922)
 Agrilus mucidus Jendek, 2013
 Agrilus mucronatus (Klug, 1825)
 Agrilus muehlei Curletti, 1998
 Agrilus muehleicus Curletti, 2002
 Agrilus muehlheimi (Obenberger, 1916)
 Agrilus mulsus Obenberger, 1935
 Agrilus multispinosus (Klug, 1825)
 Agrilus mundanus Obenberger, 1935
 Agrilus mundulus Obenberger, 1936
 Agrilus mungaii Curletti & Sakalian, 2009
 Agrilus munieri Brisout de Barneville, 1883
 Agrilus munificus Kerremans, 1897
 Agrilus muong Descarpentries & Villiers, 1967
 Agrilus murrayi Saunders, 1871
 Agrilus murzini Curletti, 1995
 Agrilus muscarius Kerremans, 1895
 Agrilus muscicoloratus Hespenheide, 1990
 Agrilus mustus Kerremans, 1912
 Agrilus mutabilis Waterhouse, 1889
 Agrilus muticus LeConte, 1858
 Agrilus mwengwae Obenberger, 1935
 Agrilus myopic Jendek, 2000
 Agrilus myops Curletti, 1998
 Agrilus myrmido Kerremans, 1912
 Agrilus nagahatai Jendek, 2007
 Agrilus nagaoi Nakane, 1983
 Agrilus naivashensis Curletti & Sakalian, 2007
 Agrilus nalajchanus Cobos, 1968
 Agrilus nalandae Théry, 1904
 Agrilus naomii Tôyama, 1988
 Agrilus napatecutli Fisher, 1938
 Agrilus narcissus Obenberger, 1917
 Agrilus natalensis Obenberger, 1935
 Agrilus nataligenus Obenberger, 1935
 Agrilus navarrei Baudon, 1965
 Agrilus neabditus Knull, 1935
 Agrilus nebulatus Curletti, 2006
 Agrilus nebulosus Jendek, 2013
 Agrilus needhami Obenberger, 1933
 Agrilus neelgheriensis Kerremans, 1892
 Agrilus nelae Curletti, 2000
 Agrilus nelsondaimio Ohmomo, 2006
 Agrilus nemethi Théry, 1930
 Agrilus neocles Obenberger, 1932
 Agrilus neocollaris Hespenheide, 1974
 Agrilus neoflohri Hespenheide, 1974
 Agrilus neoprosopidus Knull, 1938
 Agrilus nepalensis Tôyama, 1988
 Agrilus nervosus Kerremans, 1900
 Agrilus neuquensis Kerremans, 1903
 Agrilus nevadensis Horn, 1891
 Agrilus nevermanni Fisher, 1929
 Agrilus nginni Baudon, 1968
 Agrilus ngonensis Baudon, 1968
 Agrilus nickerli Obenberger, 1935
 Agrilus nicolanus Obenberger, 1924
 Agrilus niehuisi Curletti, 1995
 Agrilus niger Gory & Laporte, 1837
 Agrilus nigerellus Thomson, 1879
 Agrilus nigeriae Obenberger, 1935
 Agrilus nigerrimus Deyrolle, 1864
 Agrilus nigricans Gory, 1841
 Agrilus nigritus Kerremans, 1895
 Agrilus nigroaeneus Deyrolle, 1864
 Agrilus nigroauratus Hespenheide, 1990
 Agrilus nigrocinctus Saunders, 1874
 Agrilus nigrocyaneus Deyrolle, 1864
 Agrilus nigrofasciatus (Gory & Laporte, 1839)
 Agrilus nigroviolaceus Deyrolle, 1864
 Agrilus niisatoi Tôyama, 1987
 Agrilus ningpoensis Obenberger, 1927
 Agrilus nipponigena Obenberger, 1935
 Agrilus nirius Obenberger, 1924
 Agrilus nishiyamai Tôyama, 1985
 Agrilus nitidifrons Kerremans, 1898
 Agrilus nitidus Kerremans, 1898
 Agrilus niveoguttatus Kerremans, 1892
 Agrilus niveosignatus Obenberger, 1914
 Agrilus niviferus (Théry, 1905)
 Agrilus nivosus Abeille de Perrin, 1900
 Agrilus nixius Kerremans, 1896
 Agrilus njegus Obenberger, 1935
 Agrilus njugunai Curletti & Sakalian, 2009
 Agrilus nobilis Burmeister, 1872
 Agrilus nobilitatus Kerremans, 1899
 Agrilus nocturnus Curletti, 2006
 Agrilus nodieri Obenberger, 1924
 Agrilus nodifrons Waterhouse, 1889
 Agrilus noguerae Hespenheide, 1990
 Agrilus nokrek Jendek, 2007
 Agrilus normanbyanus Curletti, 2006
 Agrilus nossibanus Obenberger, 1931
 Agrilus notabilis Kerremans, 1900
 Agrilus notatus Kerremans, 1899
 Agrilus notoclavus Jendek, 2000
 Agrilus notus Kerremans, 1903
 Agrilus novaki Curletti & Sakalian, 2009
 Agrilus nubeculosus Fairmaire, 1890
 Agrilus nubilus Kerremans, 1892
 Agrilus nudatus Kerremans, 1894
 Agrilus numbat Curletti, 2001
 Agrilus oasis Obenberger, 1922
 Agrilus obdurescens Obenberger, 1928
 Agrilus oberprieleri Curletti, 2000
 Agrilus oberthuri Kerremans, 1897
 Agrilus oblatus Kerremans, 1900
 Agrilus oblitus Waterhouse, 1889
 Agrilus oblongonotatus Curletti, 2002
 Agrilus oblongus Fisher, 1928
 Agrilus obnotatus Kerremans, 1912
 Agrilus obnubiloides Obenberger, 1935
 Agrilus obolinus LeConte, 1860
 Agrilus obrienorum Hespenheide in Hespenheide & Bellamy, 2009
 Agrilus obscurecinctus Obenberger, 1935
 Agrilus obscureguttatus (Waterhouse, 1889)
 Agrilus obscurellus Thomson, 1878
 Agrilus obscuricollis Kiesenwetter, 1857
 Agrilus obscuricolor Hespenheide, 1990
 Agrilus obscurilineatus Vogt, 1949
 Agrilus obscuripennis Gory, 1841
 Agrilus obscurosericeus Obenberger, 1940
 Agrilus obscurus Deyrolle, 1864
 Agrilus observans Waterhouse, 1889
 Agrilus obsoletoguttatus Gory, 1841
 Agrilus obsoletovittatus Fisher, 1929
 Agrilus obsoletulus Obenberger, 1935
 Agrilus obsoletus Gory, 1841
 Agrilus obtusus Horn, 1891
 Agrilus obustulus Obenberger, 1924
 Agrilus occidenticola Obenberger, 1936
 Agrilus occipitalis (Eschscholtz, 1822)
 Agrilus oceanicus Cobos, 1959
 Agrilus ocellatus Curletti, 1998
 Agrilus ochraceomaculatus Fisher, 1929
 Agrilus octavius Obenberger, 1935
 Agrilus octogemmatus Obenberger, 1935
 Agrilus octonotatus Saunders, 1866
 Agrilus octosignatus Gyllenhal in Schönherr, 1817
 Agrilus ocularis Deyrolle, 1864
 Agrilus ocularius Curletti, 1998
 Agrilus oculatus Waterhouse, 1889
 Agrilus oculifer Kerremans, 1899
 Agrilus ocyalus Obenberger, 1942
 Agrilus odegaardi Curletti, 2005
 Agrilus odetteae Baudon, 1968
 Agrilus oedipus Deyrolle, 1864
 Agrilus ogatai Ohmomo, 2002
 Agrilus ogloblini Obenberger, 1933
 Agrilus ogooueensis Théry, 1931
 Agrilus ohioensis Knull, 1951
 Agrilus oishii Tôyama, 1987
 Agrilus okinawensis Miwa, 1933
 Agrilus olentangyi Champlain & Knull, 1925
 Agrilus olifantinus Obenberger, 1939
 Agrilus olivaceoaeneus Hespenheide, 1990
 Agrilus olivaceocupreus Hespenheide, 1990
 Agrilus olivaceoniger Fisher, 1928
 Agrilus oliveri Niehuis, 1989
 Agrilus olivicolor Kiesenwetter, 1857
 Agrilus olmii Curletti, 1998
 Agrilus olympicus Deyrolle, 1864
 Agrilus omearai Curletti, 2000
 Agrilus omecatli Fisher, 1938
 Agrilus ometauhtli Fisher, 1938
 Agrilus omissulus Obenberger, 1935
 Agrilus omissus Kerremans, 1903
 Agrilus omphax Obenberger, 1933
 Agrilus oneratus Obenberger, 1924
 Agrilus oomsisensis Curletti, 2006
 Agrilus opacipennis Waterhouse, 1889
 Agrilus operosus Obenberger, 1924
 Agrilus ophidius Curletti, 2006
 Agrilus ophthalmoedrus Obenberger, 1935
 Agrilus opimus Kerremans, 1897
 Agrilus oppositus Obenberger, 1924
 Agrilus optatus Obenberger, 1924
 Agrilus opuchtli Fisher, 1938
 Agrilus opulentus Kerremans, 1900
 Agrilus orangei Curletti, 2000
 Agrilus orbatus Kerremans, 1903
 Agrilus oreophilus Fisher, 1921
 Agrilus orestes Kerremans, 1913
 Agrilus orgetorix Obenberger, 1933
 Agrilus orientis Obenberger, 1924
 Agrilus ornamentifer Obenberger, 1940
 Agrilus ornatulus Horn, 1891
 Agrilus ornatus Deyrolle, 1864
 Agrilus oromo Curletti, 2002
 Agrilus orothi Baudon, 1965
 Agrilus osburni Knull, 1936
 Agrilus ostellinoi Curletti, 2003
 Agrilus ostentator Kerremans, 1900
 Agrilus ostrinus Kerremans, 1892
 Agrilus otiosus Say, 1833
 Agrilus overlaeti Burgeon, 1941
 Agrilus owas Gory & Laporte, 1837
 Agrilus pabulator Obenberger, 1932
 Agrilus pacatus Kerremans, 1913
 Agrilus pacholatkoi Jendek, 1994
 Agrilus pachycerus Pochon, 1972
 Agrilus pacificus Thomson, 1879
 Agrilus paganettii Obenberger, 1913
 Agrilus paganus Deyrolle, 1864
 Agrilus pagdeni Fisher, 1933
 Agrilus paimpolaiseae Baudon, 1968
 Agrilus palaestes Obenberger, 1932
 Agrilus palawanensis Fisher, 1921
 Agrilus palii Baudon, 1968
 Agrilus palilogus Obenberger, 1933
 Agrilus pallon Obenberger, 1933
 Agrilus palmerleei Knull, 1944
 Agrilus paludicola Krogerus, 1922
 Agrilus pangalae Théry, 1931
 Agrilus panhensis Baudon, 1968
 Agrilus pao Jendek, 2007
 Agrilus papuanus Gestro, 1877
 Agrilus parabductus Knull, 1954
 Agrilus paracelti Knull, 1972
 Agrilus paracuspidatus Obenberger, 1939
 Agrilus paradelphus Obenberger, 1933
 Agrilus paradiseus Obenberger, 1924
 Agrilus paradoxus Boheman, 1858
 Agrilus paraimpexus Hespenheide, 2007
 Agrilus parallelus Deyrolle, 1864
 Agrilus paramacer Hespenheide in Hespenheide & Bellamy, 2009
 Agrilus paramasculinus Champlain & Knull, 1923
 Agrilus parapupalus Curletti, 1998
 Agrilus parasimilanus Obenberger, 1933
 Agrilus parizotae Baudon, 1968
 Agrilus parkeri Knull, 1935
 Agrilus parkinsoniae Hespenheide in Hespenheide & Bellamy, 2009
 Agrilus parsysti Curletti, 2002
 Agrilus parvulus Deyrolle, 1864
 Agrilus parvus Saunders, 1870
 Agrilus parvusculus Obenberger, 1936
 Agrilus passerculus Obenberger, 1935
 Agrilus patricius Obenberger, 1931
 Agrilus patrizzii Théry, 1927
 Agrilus pattoni Obenberger, 1933
 Agrilus pauciguttatus Saunders, 1867
 Agrilus paucipilis Obenberger, 1935
 Agrilus paulyi Curletti, 1997
 Agrilus pauper Deyrolle, 1864
 Agrilus pauperculus Gory, 1841
 Agrilus pausias Obenberger, 1935
 Agrilus pavidus (Fabricius, 1793)
 Agrilus pavlinae Curletti & Sakalian, 2009
 Agrilus paynali Fisher, 1938
 Agrilus pecirkai Obenberger, 1916
 Agrilus pecoudi Descarpentries & Villiers, 1963
 Agrilus pectoralis Waterhouse, 1889
 Agrilus pediculus Curletti, 1999
 Agrilus pedroi Obenberger, 1935
 Agrilus pekinensis Obenberger, 1924
 Agrilus pellitus Curletti, 2006
 Agrilus pelops Obenberger, 1935
 Agrilus penangensis Obenberger, 1936
 Agrilus penevi Curletti & Sakalian, 2009
 Agrilus peninsularis Van Dyke, 1942
 Agrilus pensus Horn, 1891
 Agrilus perakianus Kerremans, 1900
 Agrilus perangustus Kerremans, 1897
 Agrilus peraptulus Obenberger, 1935
 Agrilus percarus Kerremans, 1894
 Agrilus peregrinus Kiesenwetter in Kraatz & Kiesenwetter, 1879
 Agrilus peresoso Curletti, 2005
 Agrilus perfuga Obenberger, 1935
 Agrilus perisi Cobos, 1986
 Agrilus perlisensis Fisher, 1936
 Agrilus perlucidus Gory, 1841
 Agrilus perniciosellus Obenberger, 1924
 Agrilus perniciosus Deyrolle, 1864
 Agrilus perniger Obenberger, 1931
 Agrilus perparvus Obenberger, 1918
 Agrilus perpastus Curletti, 2009
 Agrilus perplexus Burmeister, 1872
 Agrilus perrieri Fairmaire, 1902
 Agrilus perrini Pic, 1905
 Agrilus perroti Descarpentries & Villiers, 1963
 Agrilus persolitarius Obenberger, 1924
 Agrilus pertener Obenberger, 1935
 Agrilus pertenuis Kerremans, 1897
 Agrilus pertristis Obenberger, 1933
 Agrilus perviridis Kerremans, 1894
 Agrilus pescaroloi Curletti & Dutto, 1999
 Agrilus petarensis Kerremans, 1896
 Agrilus petronius Obenberger, 1933
 Agrilus pexus Kerremans, 1912
 Agrilus phaenicopterus Waterhouse, 1889
 Agrilus phanaeus Obenberger, 1933
 Agrilus pharao Obenberger, 1923
 Agrilus philippinensis Fisher, 1921
 Agrilus phlegyas Obenberger, 1935
 Agrilus phoenix Obenberger, 1935
 Agrilus phorcus Obenberger, 1935
 Agrilus picinus Fisher, 1943
 Agrilus pictipennis Gory & Laporte, 1837
 Agrilus pictithorax Obenberger, 1924
 Agrilus picturatus Jendek, 2013
 Agrilus pictus Kerremans, 1897
 Agrilus pidjinus Obenberger, 1924
 Agrilus pierrei Descarpentries & Villiers, 1963
 Agrilus pilicauda Saunders, 1874
 Agrilus piliferus Kerremans, 1897
 Agrilus pilipennis Obenberger, 1924
 Agrilus pilistoma Obenberger, 1924
 Agrilus piliventris Deyrolle, 1864
 Agrilus pilosellus Thomson, 1878
 Agrilus pilosicollis Fisher, 1928
 Agrilus pilosidorsis Obenberger, 1924
 Agrilus pilosotibialis Descarpentries, 1958
 Agrilus pilosovittatus Saunders, 1873
 Agrilus pilosus Waterhouse, 1889
 Agrilus pimenteli Théry, 1947
 Agrilus pinguis Kerremans, 1897
 Agrilus pinhadaensis Obenberger, 1932
 Agrilus pinii Gestro, 1877
 Agrilus pisander Obenberger, 1933
 Agrilus piscis Gory, 1841
 Agrilus pisinoe Gory, 1841
 Agrilus pistaciophagus Alexeev & Kulinitsh, 1962
 Agrilus placens Kerremans, 1897
 Agrilus placidus Kerremans, 1894
 Agrilus plagiatus Ganglbauer, 1890
 Agrilus planatus Waterhouse, 1889
 Agrilus planchardi Descarpentries & Villiers, 1963
 Agrilus planipennis Fairmaire, 1888 — emerald ash borer
 Agrilus plasoni Obenberger, 1917
 Agrilus plavilstshikovi Alexeev in Alexeev & Volkovitsh, 1989
 Agrilus plebejus Deyrolle, 1864
 Agrilus plicaticollis Kerremans, 1888
 Agrilus plicatus Kerremans, 1903
 Agrilus pliculipennis Obenberger, 1940
 Agrilus plutonicellus Thomson, 1879
 Agrilus plutonius Obenberger, 1935
 Agrilus pluvialis Curletti, 1996
 Agrilus pluvius Jendek, 2013
 Agrilus poecilus Obenberger, 1923
 Agrilus poeta Obenberger, 1936
 Agrilus pohnertianus Obenberger, 1935
 Agrilus polinae Curletti & Sakalian, 2009
 Agrilus politus (Say, 1825)
 Agrilus pollux Obenberger, 1935
 Agrilus polyctor Obenberger, 1931
 Agrilus pondo Obenberger, 1935
 Agrilus popovi Curletti & Sakalian, 2009
 Agrilus portonovencis Kerremans, 1903
 Agrilus posticalis Gory & Laporte, 1837
 Agrilus postulator Kerremans, 1897
 Agrilus potens Kerremans, 1912
 Agrilus pouesseli Baudon, 1960
 Agrilus praecipuus Kerremans, 1897
 Agrilus praedae Fisher, 1943
 Agrilus praelucens Kerremans, 1897
 Agrilus praemitis Curletti, 2009
 Agrilus praepolitus Wickham, 1914
 Agrilus praetextus Bourgoin, 1922
 Agrilus praetor Obenberger, 1931
 Agrilus pratensis (Ratzeburg, 1837)
 Agrilus pravus Kerremans, 1912
 Agrilus presli Obenberger, 1932
 Agrilus pretiosissimus Kerremans, 1899
 Agrilus pretiosus Deyrolle, 1864
 Agrilus preyssleri Obenberger, 1933
 Agrilus priamus Kerremans, 1912
 Agrilus prionurus Chevrolat, 1838
 Agrilus priscus Obenberger, 1935
 Agrilus prismaticus Kerremans, 1897
 Agrilus proaemulus Obenberger, 1935
 Agrilus probus Kerremans, 1897
 Agrilus prodigiosus Fisher, 1933
 Agrilus proditor Obenberger, 1917
 Agrilus profugellus Thomson, 1878
 Agrilus prolectus Obenberger, 1935
 Agrilus prolixus Kerremans, 1897
 Agrilus proserpinae Curletti, 2010
 Agrilus prosopidis Fisher, 1928
 Agrilus prosternidens Obenberger, 1935
 Agrilus protectus Curletti, 2000
 Agrilus protenor Obenberger, 1924
 Agrilus proteus Abeille de Perrin, 1893
 Agrilus provincialis Curletti, 1998
 Agrilus proximulus Fisher, 1933
 Agrilus proximus Saunders, 1870
 Agrilus prudens Kerremans, 1897
 Agrilus pruinosus Chevrolat, 1838
 Agrilus przewalskii Obenberger, 1936
 Agrilus pseudinamoenus Descarpentries & Villiers, 1967
 Agrilus pseudoambiguus Jendek, 2013
 Agrilus pseudobscuricollis Jendek, 2007
 Agrilus pseudoconstantini Alexeev, 1981
 Agrilus pseudocoryli Fisher, 1928
 Agrilus pseudocyaneus Kiesenwetter, 1857
 Agrilus pseudofallax Frost, 1923
 Agrilus pseudograminis Jendek, 2007
 Agrilus pseudoharlequin Jendek in Jendek & Grebennikov, 2009
 Agrilus pseudolimoniastri Cobos, 1968
 Agrilus pseudolituratus Descarpentries, 1959
 Agrilus pseudonubeculosus Descarpentries, 1959
 Agrilus pseudoostrinus Jendek, 2000
 Agrilus pseudoparagrilus Obenberger, 1933
 Agrilus pseudopurpuratus Descarpentries & Bruneau de Miré, 1963
 Agrilus pseudosallei Hespenheide in Westcott, et al., 2008
 Agrilus pseudosericans Obenberger, 1936
 Agrilus pseudosimilanus Obenberger, 1933
 Agrilus pseudoussuricola Alexeev, 1979
 Agrilus pterochlorus Obenberger, 1924
 Agrilus pterostigma Obenberger, 1927
 Agrilus puberulus Deyrolle, 1864
 Agrilus pubescens Fisher, 1928
 Agrilus pubifrons Fisher, 1928
 Agrilus pubiventris Kiewsenwetter, 1857
 Agrilus pubornatus Jendek, 2001
 Agrilus pudens Kerremans, 1897
 Agrilus pudoratus Curletti, 2006
 Agrilus puellus Gory & Laporte, 1837
 Agrilus puerilis Kerremans, 1897
 Agrilus pugionellus Thomson, 1879
 Agrilus pugionifer Schaufuss, 1877
 Agrilus pugionifer Schaufuss, 1877
 Agrilus pujoli Descarpentries, 1963
 Agrilus pulchellus Bland, 1865
 Agrilus pulcher Saunders, 1874
 Agrilus pulex Curletti & Bellamy, 2005
 Agrilus pullulus Waterhouse, 1889
 Agrilus pulvereus Abeille de Perrin, 1895
 Agrilus pulverosus Chevrolat, 1838
 Agrilus pumilo Curletti, 2011
 Agrilus punctatissimus Waterhouse, 1889
 Agrilus puncticeps LeConte, 1860
 Agrilus punctifrons Deyrolle, 1864
 Agrilus puniceus Kerremans, 1897
 Agrilus pupalinus Curletti, 1998
 Agrilus pupalus Obenberger, 1935
 Agrilus pupillus Deyrolle, 1864
 Agrilus purpuratus (Klug, 1829)
 Agrilus purpurescens Kerremans, 1892
 Agrilus purpurifrons Deyrolle, 1864
 Agrilus purus Kerremans, 1900
 Agrilus pusillesculptus Obenberger, 1940
 Agrilus putillus Say, 1833
 Agrilus putzeysi Obenberger, 1933
 Agrilus pygaera Obenberger, 1931
 Agrilus pylnovi Obenberger, 1933
 Agrilus pyoti Curletti, 2000
 Agrilus pyritosus Kerremans, 1900
 Agrilus pyropygus Thomson, 1878
 Agrilus pyrosurus Gory & Laporte, 1837
 Agrilus qinling Jendek, 2000
 Agrilus quadraticollis Fairmaire, 1902
 Agrilus quadricostatus Waterhouse, 1889
 Agrilus quadriguttatellus Thomson, 1879
 Agrilus quadriguttatus Gory, 1841
 Agrilus quadriimpressus Ziegler, 1845
 Agrilus quadrimaculatus Waterhouse, 1889
 Agrilus quadrinotatus Gory, 1841
 Agrilus quadriplagiatus Fisher, 1921
 Agrilus quadripunctatus Deyrolle, 1864
 Agrilus quadrisignatus Marseul, 1866
 Agrilus quadrispilotus Obenberger, 1935
 Agrilus quadristigmula Obenberger, 1936
 Agrilus quadruplex Curletti & Dutto, 1999
 Agrilus quaestionis Obenberger, 1931
 Agrilus quaestor Obenberger, 1931
 Agrilus quattuordecimsignatus Obenberger, 1935
 Agrilus queenslandiae Obenberger, 1936
 Agrilus queenslandicus Curletti, 2008
 Agrilus quentini Descarpentries & Villiers, 1963
 Agrilus quercicola Fisher, 1928
 Agrilus quercus Schaeffer, 1905
 Agrilus quetzalcoatli Fisher, 1938
 Agrilus quietus Kerremans, 1897
 Agrilus quilmesinus Obenberger, 1933
 Agrilus raapi Kerremans, 1900
 Agrilus rabaticus Théry, 1930
 Agrilus radiolus Kerremans, 1913
 Agrilus raffrayi Thomson, 1879
 Agrilus raphelisi Obenberger, 1923
 Agrilus rarus Kerremans, 1897
 Agrilus rastellii Curletti, 1998
 Agrilus ratus Waterhouse, 1889
 Agrilus raventazonus Fisher, 1929
 Agrilus recellens Obenberger, 1935
 Agrilus rectus Deyrolle, 1864
 Agrilus redtenbacheri Obenberger, 1933
 Agrilus refectus Waterhouse, 1889
 Agrilus regius Curletti, 1998
 Agrilus regulus Obenberger, 1935
 Agrilus reichardti Obenberger, 1935
 Agrilus reimoseri Obenberger, 1933
 Agrilus relegatoides Novak, 2003
 Agrilus relegatus Curletti, 1990
 Agrilus reliquus Kerremans, 1903
 Agrilus remuneratus Obenberger, 1935
 Agrilus remus Obenberger, 1935
 Agrilus repercussus Kerremans, 1893
 Agrilus restrictus Waterhouse, 1889
 Agrilus reynoldsi Obenberger, 1935
 Agrilus rhodesi Obenberger, 1935
 Agrilus rhoos Królik & Niehuis, 2003
 Agrilus rhopalocerus Pochon, 1972
 Agrilus ribbei Kiesenwetter in Kraatz & Kiesenwetter, 1879
 Agrilus ribesi Schaefer, 1946
 Agrilus richardae Descarpentries & Villiers, 1963
 Agrilus rifkindi Hespenheide in Hespenheide & Bellamy, 2009
 Agrilus rilliardi Baudon, 1988
 Agrilus rimosicollis Kerremans, 1897
 Agrilus ritavillensis Baudon, 1968
 Agrilus rivalieri Descarpentries & Villiers, 1963
 Agrilus robustipenis Jendek, 2000
 Agrilus rockefelleri Cazier, 1951
 Agrilus rodzjankoi Obenberger, 1933
 Agrilus rokuyai Kurosawa, 1976
 Agrilus rolciki Jendek in Jendek & Grebennikov, 2009
 Agrilus romanovi Obenberger, 1935
 Agrilus romulus Obenberger, 1935
 Agrilus rondoni Baudon, 1968
 Agrilus roroensis Gestro, 1877
 Agrilus rosazzae Curletti, 2003
 Agrilus roscidellinus Obenberger, 1935
 Agrilus roscidiformis Obenberger, 1916
 Agrilus roscidinus Obenberger, 1923
 Agrilus roscidoides Abielle de Perrin, 1909
 Agrilus roscidulus Abeille de Perrin, 1897
 Agrilus roscidus Kiesenwetter, 1857
 Agrilus rosei Niehuis & Bernhard, 2005
 Agrilus roseus Curletti, 2002
 Agrilus rossanae Curletti, 2005
 Agrilus rossii Curletti, 1997
 Agrilus rotundipennis Fisher, 1921
 Agrilus rotundus Curletti, 1998
 Agrilus rougeoti Descarpentries & Villiers, 1963
 Agrilus rousselatae Baudon, 1968
 Agrilus rubescens Curletti, 1998
 Agrilus rubicundus Kerremans, 1913
 Agrilus rubifrons Deyrolle, 1864
 Agrilus rubroniger Hespenheide, 1979
 Agrilus rubrovittatus (Waterhouse, 1889)
 Agrilus rudicollis Alexeev, 1981
 Agrilus rudidorsis Obenberger, 1935
 Agrilus rudissimus Obenberger, 1935
 Agrilus rudolphi Obenberger, 1935
 Agrilus ruficollis (Fabricius, 1787) — rednecked cane borer
 Agrilus ruficornis Curletti, 1997
 Agrilus rufobrunneus Fisher, 1933
 Agrilus rufocentralis Thomson, 1878
 Agrilus rufopictus Kerremans, 1899
 Agrilus rufuscapitae Curletti, 2005
 Agrilus ruginosus (Waterhouse, 1889)
 Agrilus rugiplumbus Cobos, 1964
 Agrilus rugivertex Obenberger, 1935
 Agrilus rugosicollis Blanchard, 1846
 Agrilus rugosus Waterhouse, 1889
 Agrilus rustenburgensis Obenberger, 1939
 Agrilus ruteri Descarpentries & Villiers, 1963
 Agrilus ruzzieri Curletti, 2016
 Agrilus sacer Kerremans, 1900
 Agrilus sachalinensis Obenberger, 1935
 Agrilus sachalinicola Obenberger, 1940
 Agrilus sadahiroi Tôyama, 1987
 Agrilus saganaensis Obenberger, 1935
 Agrilus sagax Kerremans, 1912
 Agrilus sagittarius Curletti, 1997
 Agrilus sahelicus Curletti, 1998
 Agrilus sainthilairei Obenberger, 1933
 Agrilus sainvali Curletti, 1997
 Agrilus saleius Obenberger, 1935
 Agrilus salicis Frivaldszky, 1877
 Agrilus salicivola Kurosawa, 1963
 Agrilus salisburyensis Obenberger, 1931
 Agrilus sallei Dugès, 1878
 Agrilus salmo Obenberger, 1935
 Agrilus saltensis Kerremans, 1903
 Agrilus salviaphilos Manley, 1979
 Agrilus salweenensis Stebbing, 1914
 Agrilus samai Magnani, 1995
 Agrilus samaricus Curletti & Vayssières, 2007
 Agrilus samawangensis Fisher, 1930
 Agrilus samboides Fisher, 1930
 Agrilus samoensis Blair, 1928
 Agrilus samuelsoni Tôyama, 1985
 Agrilus samuelsonicus Curletti, 2006
 Agrilus samyi Baudon, 1968
 Agrilus sanatus Obenberger, 1935
 Agrilus sanchezae Hespenheide, 1990
 Agrilus sandakanus Obenberger, 1924
 Agrilus sangadzinus Théry, 1934
 Agrilus sanguineus Curletti, 1997
 Agrilus sanjosensis Fisher, 1938
 Agrilus sannio Curletti, 1997
 Agrilus sanpauloi Bellamy, 1998
 Agrilus sapindi Knull, 1938
 Agrilus sarawakensis Hoscheck, 1931
 Agrilus satoi Kurosawa, 1954
 Agrilus saturnus Curletti, 1998
 Agrilus satyrus Curletti, 2006
 Agrilus saucius Curletti, 2002
 Agrilus saudita Curletti, 1998
 Agrilus saundersianus Obenberger, 1924
 Agrilus saundersii Murray, 1868
 Agrilus sausai Jendek, 2001
 Agrilus saussurei Obenberger, 1933
 Agrilus sauteri Kerremans, 1912
 Agrilus savanae Curletti, 2000
 Agrilus sayi Saunders, 1870
 Agrilus scabiosus Thomson, 1878
 Agrilus scabrosus Waterhouse, 1889
 Agrilus sceptuchus Obenberger, 1933
 Agrilus scerbakovi Obenberger, 1935
 Agrilus schmidli Curletti, 2005
 Agrilus schmidtgoebeli Obenberger, 1935
 Agrilus scholtzi Curletti, 2000
 Agrilus schoutedeni Kerremans, 1912
 Agrilus schreineri Obenberger, 1933
 Agrilus schultzei Kerremans, 1907
 Agrilus schwerdtfegeri Obenberger, 1957
 Agrilus scitulus Horn, 1891
 Agrilus scitus Obenberger, 1935
 Agrilus scopiazon Obenberger, 1933
 Agrilus scrobicollis Thomson, 1879
 Agrilus sculpturatus Kerremans, 1897
 Agrilus scurra Curletti, 2002
 Agrilus scutatus Curletti, 1998
 Agrilus scutellaris Deyrolle, 1864
 Agrilus scythicus Królik & Janicki, 2005
 Agrilus sedlaceki Curletti, 2006
 Agrilus sedonensis Baudon, 1968
 Agrilus sedyi Obenberger, 1933
 Agrilus seiunctus Curletti & Dutto, 1999
 Agrilus sejeani Baudon, 1968
 Agrilus sekerai Obenberger, 1933
 Agrilus sekii Ohmomo, 2004
 Agrilus sellatus Kerremans, 1898
 Agrilus semarangi Obenberger, 1931
 Agrilus semenovi (Obenberger, 1931)
 Agrilus semerdjievi Curletti & Sakalian, 2009
 Agrilus semiaeneus Deyrolle, 1864
 Agrilus semiaurovittatus Kurosawa, 1954
 Agrilus semicauducus Jendek in Jendek & Grebennikov, 2009
 Agrilus semicinctus Curletti, 2010
 Agrilus semifossus Fairmaire, 1898
 Agrilus seminudus Curletti, 2006
 Agrilus semiopacus Fisher, 1933
 Agrilus semipubescens Fisher, 1921
 Agrilus semirjeciae Obenberger, 1936
 Agrilus semperi Saunders, 1874
 Agrilus senegalensis Gory & Laporte, 1837
 Agrilus senilis Kerremans, 1914
 Agrilus senohi Tôyama, 1988
 Agrilus sensitivus Kerremans, 1897
 Agrilus sepulchralis Deyrolle, 1864
 Agrilus serenae Curletti, 2002
 Agrilus sericans Kiesenwetter, 1857
 Agrilus sericarius Abeille de Perrin, 1897
 Agrilus sericeipilis Obenberger, 1935
 Agrilus sericeiplagis Obenberger, 1935
 Agrilus seroli Baudon, 1968
 Agrilus servius Obenberger, 1935
 Agrilus servus Curletti & Dutto, 1999
 Agrilus sesostris Fisher, 1929
 Agrilus setipes Chevrolat, 1838
 Agrilus severini Obenberger, 1933
 Agrilus sexflavoguttatellus Thomson, 1879
 Agrilus sexguttatellus Thomson, 1879
 Agrilus sexguttatus (Thunberg, 1789)
 Agrilus sexmaculatus Waterhouse, 1889
 Agrilus sexnotatus Gory & Laporte, 1837
 Agrilus sexpunctatus Deyrolle, 1864
 Agrilus sexsignatus Fisher, 1921
 Agrilus shaowensis Jendek, 1994
 Agrilus sharpi Obenberger, 1933
 Agrilus shashamboe Kurosawa, 1963
 Agrilus shaumaae Descarpentries & Villiers, 1963
 Agrilus shibatai Kurosawa, 1964
 Agrilus shoemakeri Knull, 1938
 Agrilus siamensis Tôyama, 1987
 Agrilus sibiricolus Obenberger, 1924
 Agrilus sibiricus Obenberger, 1912
 Agrilus sicardi (Théry, 1912)
 Agrilus sicariellus Thomson, 1879
 Agrilus sierrae Van Dyke, 1923
 Agrilus signatus Waterhouse, 1889
 Agrilus sikkimensis Obenberger, 1928
 Agrilus silantjevi Obenberger, 1931
 Agrilus silvanus Curletti, 1996
 Agrilus silvaticus Curletti, 2002
 Agrilus silvestrii Obenberger, 1935
 Agrilus silviettae Curletti, 2005
 Agrilus simbirensis Obenberger, 1925
 Agrilus similanus Obenberger, 1933
 Agrilus simillipictus Obenberger, 1924
 Agrilus simoni Kerremans, 1896
 Agrilus simoninae Descarpentries & Villiers, 1963
 Agrilus simplex Kerremans, 1894
 Agrilus simplicellus Thomson, 1879
 Agrilus simplicicollis Waterhouse, 1889
 Agrilus simulans Waterhouse, 1889
 Agrilus sincerus Kerremans, 1897
 Agrilus sinensis Thomson, 1879
 Agrilus singkaraensis Fisher, 1926
 Agrilus singularis Kerremans, 1900
 Agrilus sinuatus (Olivier, 1790)
 Agrilus siren Gory, 1841
 Agrilus sitiens Curletti, 2000
 Agrilus skrlandti Obenberger, 1933
 Agrilus smaragdifrons Ganglbauer, 1890
 Agrilus smaragdinus Solsky, 1875
 Agrilus smatanai Jendek, 2007
 Agrilus snowi Fall, 1905
 Agrilus sobrinus Waterhouse, 1889
 Agrilus socialis Waterhouse, 1889
 Agrilus sodalis Waterhouse, 1889
 Agrilus solemnis Obenberger, 1924
 Agrilus solers Curletti, 1997
 Agrilus solieri Gory & Laporte, 1837
 Agrilus sollicitus Curletti, 2002
 Agrilus solus Obenberger, 1935
 Agrilus somalicus Kerremans, 1896
 Agrilus somalus Curletti, 1998
 Agrilus sommailae Baudon, 1965
 Agrilus somniculosus Obenberger, 1935
 Agrilus somnon Jendek, 2001
 Agrilus somsanithi Baudon, 1965
 Agrilus somsavathi Baudon, 1968
 Agrilus sorciellus Obenberger, 1932
 Agrilus sordidans Obenberger, 1931
 Agrilus sordidatus Obenberger, 1923
 Agrilus sordidulus Obenberger, 1917
 Agrilus soricellus Thomson, 1878
 Agrilus sospes Lewis, 1893
 Agrilus soudeki Obenberger, 1926
 Agrilus souliei Jendek, 1994
 Agrilus soulieri Baudon, 1968
 Agrilus souvannavongsi Baudon, 1968
 Agrilus sparsus Waterhouse, 1889
 Agrilus spathulatus (Obenberger, 1931)
 Agrilus spathulicornis Obenberger, 1935
 Agrilus speciosus Waterhouse, 1889
 Agrilus spectabilis Kerremans, 1895
 Agrilus sperator Obenberger, 1931
 Agrilus sperkii Solsky, 1873
 Agrilus spesivcevi Obenberger, 1927
 Agrilus spiculipenis Jendek in Jendek & Grebennikov, 2009
 Agrilus spinamajor Chevrolat, 1838
 Agrilus spinellifer Obenberger, 1924
 Agrilus spinicaudatus Waterhouse, 1889
 Agrilus spiniger Eschscholtz, 1822
 Agrilus spinipennis Lewis, 1893
 Agrilus spinipes Deyrolle, 1864
 Agrilus spiridion Kerremans, 1913
 Agrilus spissus Waterhouse, 1889
 Agrilus splendens Kerremans, 1897
 Agrilus splendidipodex Thomson, 1878
 Agrilus spurcites Thomson, 1879
 Agrilus spurcus (Théry, 1905)
 Agrilus squaliformis Thomson, 1878
 Agrilus squalus Waterhouse, 1889
 Agrilus squamulatus Waterhouse, 1889
 Agrilus srogli Obenberger, 1932
 Agrilus stellatus Waterhouse, 1889
 Agrilus stempfferi Descarpentries & Villiers, 1963
 Agrilus stenachon Obenberger, 1933
 Agrilus stevensoniellus Obenberger, 1935
 Agrilus stoneae Baudon, 1968
 Agrilus strandelinus Obenberger, 1936
 Agrilus strandi Obenberger, 1918
 Agrilus strandianus Obenberger, 1933
 Agrilus strephon Obenberger, 1933
 Agrilus striativentris Waterhouse, 1889
 Agrilus striatocollis Kerremans, 1892
 Agrilus striatus Curletti, 2006
 Agrilus strigifer Waterhouse, 1889
 Agrilus strigifrons Waterhouse, 1889
 Agrilus strigosus Kerremans, 1897
 Agrilus strigulioides Obenberger, 1932
 Agrilus striolatus Kerremans, 1899
 Agrilus strombus Obenberger, 1933
 Agrilus strophius Obenberger, 1933
 Agrilus suahelicus Obenberger, 1935
 Agrilus suavis Kerremans, 1897
 Agrilus subaeneus Kerremans, 1898
 Agrilus subapicalis Kerremans, 1898
 Agrilus subauratus Gebler, 1833
 Agrilus subazureus Kerremans, 1899
 Agrilus subcinctus Gory, 1841
 Agrilus subcongener Kerremans, 1899
 Agrilus subconsularis Kerremans, 1900
 Agrilus subcornutus Deyrolle, 1864
 Agrilus subcostatus Waterhouse, 1889
 Agrilus subcuneiformis Kurosawa, 1954
 Agrilus subcurtulus Kerremans, 1899
 Agrilus subdebilis Kerremans, 1899
 Agrilus subdorsalis Kerremans, 1899
 Agrilus subelongatus Kerremans, 1899
 Agrilus suberraticus Kerremans, 1903
 Agrilus subfasciatellus Obenberger, 1936
 Agrilus subfrontalis Kerremans, 1903
 Agrilus subgravidus Curletti, 1998
 Agrilus subgriseus Kerremans, 1898
 Agrilus subguttatus Waterhouse, 1889
 Agrilus subinflatus Kerremans, 1899
 Agrilus sublateralis Waterhouse, 1889
 Agrilus submendicus Obenberger, 1931
 Agrilus subnitidus Kerremans, 1898
 Agrilus subnubilis Obenberger, 1935
 Agrilus subornatus Kerremans, 1900
 Agrilus subpyropygus Kerremans, 1900
 Agrilus subrobustus Saunders, 1873
 Agrilus subrugosus Kerremans, 1899
 Agrilus subsignatus Fåhraeus in Boheman, 1851
 Agrilus subspinosus Fisher, 1921
 Agrilus subtenuis Kerremans, 1906
 Agrilus subtilipilis Obenberger, 1940
 Agrilus subtrifasciatus Deyrolle, 1864
 Agrilus subtropicus Schaeffer, 1905
 Agrilus subvalidus Kerremans, 1900
 Agrilus subvestitus Deyrolle, 1864
 Agrilus subviridis Fisher, 1921
 Agrilus subvittatus Fisher, 1921
 Agrilus sudai Kurosawa, 1985
 Agrilus suensoni Obenberger, 1940
 Agrilus sugiurai Jendek, 2007
 Agrilus sugurovi Obenberger, 1931
 Agrilus sulcatulus Chevrolat, 1835
 Agrilus sulci Obenberger, 1932
 Agrilus sulcicollis Lacordaire in Boisduval & Lacordaire, 1835
 Agrilus sulcifer Abeille de Perrin, 1895
 Agrilus sulcifrons Fåhraeus in Boheman, 1851
 Agrilus sulcinotus Jendek, 2007
 Agrilus sulcipennis Solier, 1849
 Agrilus sulphurifer Burmeister, 1872
 Agrilus sumatrae Obenberger, 1922
 Agrilus sumbuanus Kerremans, 1898
 Agrilus sumptuosissimus Obenberger, 1932
 Agrilus sundholmi Curletti, 2009
 Agrilus surdisquamis Obenberger, 1931
 Agrilus surrages Obenberger, 1935
 Agrilus surrubrensis Obenberger, 1917
 Agrilus suspiciosus Kerremans, 1897
 Agrilus suturaalba Deyrolle, 1864
 Agrilus suturalineatus Thomson, 1879
 Agrilus suturalis Deyrolle, 1864
 Agrilus suturicuspidatus Jendek, 2007
 Agrilus suturisignatus Obenberger, 1924
 Agrilus suvorovi Obenberger, 1935
 Agrilus suzukii Kurosawa, 1985
 Agrilus swifti Curletti, 2006
 Agrilus sylvestris Deyrolle, 1864
 Agrilus sylviae Niehuis, 1992
 Agrilus syndici Curletti, 1998
 Agrilus syrdarjensis Obenberger, 1928
 Agrilus syrphus Descarpentries & Villiers, 1963
 Agrilus tabaci Kerremans, 1896
 Agrilus tabogaensis Fisher, 1938
 Agrilus taciturnus Deyrolle, 1864
 Agrilus tacitus Kerremans, 1894
 Agrilus taeniatus Chevrolat, 1835
 Agrilus tahanae Fisher, 1933
 Agrilus taiwanensis Kurosawa, 1954
 Agrilus takahashii Tôyama, 1988
 Agrilus takana Fisher, 1925
 Agrilus talthybius Obenberger, 1933
 Agrilus tantillulus Obenberger, 1936
 Agrilus taoi (Tôyama, 1987)
 Agrilus tarae Bellamy, 1999
 Agrilus tardulus Obenberger, 1924
 Agrilus tarrascus Dugès, 1891
 Agrilus taveuniensis Théry, 1934
 Agrilus tayabensis Fisher, 1921
 Agrilus taylori Théry, 1947
 Agrilus tazoei Kurosawa, 1985
 Agrilus tebinganus Obenberger, 1924
 Agrilus teicuae Fisher, 1938
 Agrilus tejupilcoensis Fisher, 1933
 Agrilus telaemenes Obenberger, 1933
 Agrilus telawensis Fisher, 1935
 Agrilus telekii Gebhardt, 1926
 Agrilus telpuchtli Fisher, 1938
 Agrilus temeratus Waterhouse, 1889
 Agrilus tempestivus Lewis, 1893
 Agrilus temporalis Waterhouse, 1889
 Agrilus tenebricosus Kerremans, 1897
 Agrilus tenellus Fåhraeus in Boheman, 1851
 Agrilus tenuisculptus Obenberger, 1933
 Agrilus tenuissimus Abeille de Perrin, 1891
 Agrilus teocchii Curletti, 1998
 Agrilus terentius Obenberger, 1933
 Agrilus terminatus Thomson, 1879
 Agrilus ternatensis Obenberger, 1924
 Agrilus terraereginae Blackburn, 1892
 Agrilus tersus Kerremans, 1897
 Agrilus tervureni Curletti, 1997
 Agrilus tesselatus Jendek, 2013
 Agrilus tessmanni Curletti, 1994
 Agrilus testor Kerremans, 1900
 Agrilus tetrastictus Bourgoin, 1925
 Agrilus tezcatlipocai Fisher, 1938
 Agrilus thalassinus Deyrolle, 1864
 Agrilus thaumastus Obenberger, 1933
 Agrilus theodasae Baudon, 1968
 Agrilus theodasi Baudon, 1968
 Agrilus therondi Descarpentries & Villiers, 1963
 Agrilus thevadensis Baudon, 1968
 Agrilus thianshanskii Obenberger, 1933
 Agrilus thibetanus Obenberger, 1928
 Agrilus thomasi Baudon, 1965
 Agrilus thomasseti Théry, 1928
 Agrilus thoracellus Gory & Laporte, 1837
 Agrilus thoracicus Gory & Laporte, 1837
 Agrilus thoraciplagis Obenberger, 1935
 Agrilus thylacinus Curletti, 2001
 Agrilus tiacapanae Fisher, 1938
 Agrilus tiberius Obenberger, 1933
 Agrilus tiflisicus Obenberger, 1936
 Agrilus timidus Kerremans, 1897
 Agrilus tinantius Obenberger, 1960
 Agrilus tinctipennis Fisher, 1933
 Agrilus tiomanensis Jendek in Jendek & Grebennikov, 2009
 Agrilus titlacabanae Fisher, 1938
 Agrilus tityos Obenberger, 1935
 Agrilus tlacoae Fisher, 1938
 Agrilus tlaculteutlae Fisher, 1938
 Agrilus togoensis Kerremans, 1899
 Agrilus tokyoensis Kurosawa, 1985
 Agrilus tolianus Obenberger, 1924
 Agrilus tomentosulus Obenberger, 1917
 Agrilus tonkineus Kerremans, 1895
 Agrilus tonkinigena Obenberger, 1924
 Agrilus topazius Curletti, 1997
 Agrilus torpedo Curletti, 1995
 Agrilus torquatus LeConte, 1860
 Agrilus toteci Fisher, 1938
 Agrilus totochti Fisher, 1938
 Agrilus touareg Théry, 1930
 Agrilus townsendi Fall in Fall & Cockerell, 1907
 Agrilus toxopeusi Obenberger, 1932
 Agrilus toxotes Obenberger, 1935
 Agrilus toyoshimai Tôyama, 1988
 Agrilus tragulus Obenberger, 1935
 Agrilus tranquillus Curletti, 1997
 Agrilus transbaicalensis Obenberger, 1935
 Agrilus transimpressus Fall, 1925
 Agrilus transitorius Kerremans, 1897
 Agrilus transversesulcatus Reitter, 1890
 Agrilus transversus Kerremans, 1894
 Agrilus traymanyi Baudon, 1965
 Agrilus trepanatus Jendek, 2013
 Agrilus trevori Baudon, 1968
 Agrilus triangularis Kerremans, 1899
 Agrilus trico Curletti, 1998
 Agrilus tricolor Deyrolle, 1864
 Agrilus tridentatus Gory, 1841
 Agrilus trilineatus Hespenheide, 1988
 Agrilus trimaculatus Gory, 1841
 Agrilus trinidadensis Fisher, 1943
 Agrilus trinotatus Saunders, 1873
 Agrilus tripartitus Deyrolle, 1864
 Agrilus triptolemus Obenberger, 1935
 Agrilus trispinosus Gory, 1841
 Agrilus tristicolor Obenberger, 1931
 Agrilus tristinus Obenberger, 1924
 Agrilus tristis Deyrolle, 1864
 Agrilus trito Deyrolle, 1864
 Agrilus triton Obenberger, 1935
 Agrilus trochilus Abielle de Perrin, 1897
 Agrilus tropinii Curletti, 2002
 Agrilus truncatipennis Descarpentries & Villiers, 1967
 Agrilus truncatus Jendek, 2007
 Agrilus trypantiformis Fisher, 1929
 Agrilus tsacasi Descarpentries & Villiers, 1963
 Agrilus tsavoensis Curletti & Sakalian, 2009
 Agrilus tschitscherini Semenov, 1895
 Agrilus tshapadarensis Alexeev in Alexeev, et al., 1992
 Agrilus tsushimanus Kurosawa, 1963
 Agrilus tsutsumiuchii Ohmomo, 2006
 Agrilus tuberculicollis Kerremans, 1894
 Agrilus tuberculiventris Deyrolle, 1864
 Agrilus tuberosus Curletti, 2009
 Agrilus tubulus Kerremans, 1897
 Agrilus tucumanellus Obenberger, 1933
 Agrilus tucumanus Kerremans, 1903
 Agrilus tugio Obenberger, 1935
 Agrilus tullius Obenberger, 1933
 Agrilus tumultuosus Obenberger, 1932
 Agrilus tumupasaensis Fisher, 1925
 Agrilus turbator Obenberger, 1935
 Agrilus turcicus Marseul, 1866
 Agrilus turei Curletti, 2002
 Agrilus turgitus Kerremans, 1897
 Agrilus turnbowi Nelson, 1990
 Agrilus turneri Obenberger, 1935
 Agrilus turrialbensis Fisher, 1929
 Agrilus tyndarus Kerremans, 1913
 Agrilus tynnanthi Curletti, 2005
 Agrilus tyrannus Curletti, 2011
 Agrilus tyrtaeus Kerremans, 1913
 Agrilus uelensis Obenberger, 1935
 Agrilus uenoi Kurosawa, 1963
 Agrilus uhagoni Abeille de Perrin, 1897
 Agrilus uhligi Curletti, 2002
 Agrilus ukerewensis Obenberger, 1941
 Agrilus ukrainensis Obenberger, 1936
 Agrilus ulaangomiensis Cobos, 1972
 Agrilus ultramarinus Deyrolle, 1864
 Agrilus umactli Fisher, 1938
 Agrilus umbratus Harold, 1869
 Agrilus umbrosellus Obenberger, 1935
 Agrilus umbrosus Gory & Laporte, 1837
 Agrilus umrongso Jendek, 2013
 Agrilus undulatipennis Kurosawa, 1976
 Agrilus unguiculosus Obenberger, 1936
 Agrilus unicolor Gory & Laporte, 1837
 Agrilus unicus Kerremans, 1897
 Agrilus uniformipubis Obenberger, 1924
 Agrilus uniformis Waterhouse, 1889
 Agrilus unipunctatus Gory & Laporte, 1837
 Agrilus unus Curletti, 2005
 Agrilus urbanus Kerremans, 1897
 Agrilus uromastyx Curletti & Magnani, 2006
 Agrilus ursus Curletti, 2011
 Agrilus uruguayanus Obenberger, 1933
 Agrilus usaramoensis Kerremans, 1899
 Agrilus usingeri Fisher, 1938
 Agrilus ussuricola Obenberger, 1924
 Agrilus ustjurti Kostin, 1973
 Agrilus ustus Curletti, 2002
 Agrilus utahensis Westcott in Nelson & Westcott, 1991
 Agrilus utens Kerremans, 1897
 Agrilus uvarovi Obenberger, 1933
 Agrilus uzbekistanus Stepanov, 1958
 Agrilus vacuus Kerremans, 1912
 Agrilus vagans Harold, 1869
 Agrilus vaginalis Abeille de Perrin, 1897
 Agrilus vaillanti Obenberger, 1935
 Agrilus validiusculus Semenov, 1891
 Agrilus validus Deyrolle, 1864
 Agrilus vandenberghei Westcott & Hespenheide, 2006
 Agrilus variabilis Kerremans, 1899
 Agrilus variatus Kerremans, 1897
 Agrilus variegatus Gory & Laporte, 1837
 Agrilus varius Kerremans, 1895
 Agrilus vasiljevi Obenberger, 1933
 Agrilus vaucheri Abeille de Perrin, 1895
 Agrilus vaulogeri Bourgoin, 1922
 Agrilus vayssieresi Curletti, 2005
 Agrilus velasco Fisher, 1933
 Agrilus velatus Kerremans, 1912
 Agrilus velutinomaculatus Waterhouse, 1889
 Agrilus venosus Gory & Laporte, 1837
 Agrilus ventralis Horn, 1891
 Agrilus ventricosus Fairmaire, 1888
 Agrilus ventripotens Kerremans, 1900
 Agrilus venustulus Burmeister, 1872
 Agrilus venustus Kerremans, 1897
 Agrilus verax Kerremans, 1897
 Agrilus verityi Hespenheide, 1988
 Agrilus vermiculatus (Waterhouse, 1889)
 Agrilus versicolor Chevrolat, 1838
 Agrilus verutoides Obenberger, 1935
 Agrilus verutus Kerremans, 1897
 Agrilus vescivittatus Hespenheide & Westcott, 2011
 Agrilus vescus Kerremans, 1897
 Agrilus vespilio Kerremans, 1897
 Agrilus vestitus Deyrolle, 1864
 Agrilus vezenyii Pochon, 1967
 Agrilus vianai Obenberger, 1947
 Agrilus victima Fisher, 1944
 Agrilus victoriae Obenberger, 1923
 Agrilus videns Kerremans, 1900
 Agrilus viduus Kerremans, 1914
 Agrilus vientianensis Baudon, 1961
 Agrilus viettei Descarpentries & Villiers, 1963
 Agrilus vigilans Waterhouse, 1889
 Agrilus vilis Saunders, 1874
 Agrilus villosostriatus Thomson, 1879
 Agrilus villosulus Kerremans, 1897
 Agrilus vimmerianus Obenberger, 1935
 Agrilus vinctus Fisher, 1933
 Agrilus vinitius Obenberger, 1933
 Agrilus violaceicollis Gory, 1841
 Agrilus violacellus Thomson, 1879
 Agrilus violaceoviridis Cobos, 1967
 Agrilus violaceus Nonfried, 1892
 Agrilus virescens Gory & Laporte, 1837
 Agrilus viridanus (Kerremans, 1900)
 Agrilus viridator Obenberger, 1923
 Agrilus viridescens Knull, 1935
 Agrilus viridiaeneus Deyrolle, 1864
 Agrilus viridiaeris Curletti, 2005
 Agrilus viridicaerulans Marseul, 1865
 Agrilus viridicellus Cobos, 1964
 Agrilus viridicephalus Fisher, 1929
 Agrilus viridicolor Obenberger, 1924
 Agrilus viridicupreus Saunders, 1866
 Agrilus viridifrons Kerremans, 1893
 Agrilus viridiobscurus Saunders, 1873
 Agrilus viridis (Linnaeus, 1758) — beech splendour beetle
 Agrilus viridissimus Cobos, 1964
 Agrilus virilis Curletti, 2006
 Agrilus visnu Obenberger, 1916
 Agrilus vitellius Obenberger, 1935
 Agrilus vittaticollis (Randall, 1838)
 Agrilus vittatus Deyrolle, 1864
 Agrilus vittulus Waterhouse, 1889
 Agrilus vitzilopuchtli Fisher, 1938
 Agrilus vixtocioatlae Fisher, 1938
 Agrilus vlachi Obenberger, 1933
 Agrilus voegelini Théry, 1934
 Agrilus volkovitshi Jendek, 2007
 Agrilus volof Curletti, 1998
 Agrilus volucer Kerremans, 1897
 Agrilus voluptuosus Kerremans, 1897
 Agrilus voriseki Jendek, 1995
 Agrilus votus Kerremans, 1897
 Agrilus vseteckai Obenberger, 1935
 Agrilus vulcanus Deyrolle, 1864
 Agrilus vulgaris Harold, 1878
 Agrilus wagneranus Curletti, 1999
 Agrilus wagneri Kerremans, 1913
 Agrilus walesicus Obenberger, 1923
 Agrilus walkeri Théry, 1904
 Agrilus wallaby Curletti, 2001
 Agrilus wallaroo Curletti, 2001
 Agrilus walshi Fisher, 1937
 Agrilus walsinghami Crotch, 1873
 Agrilus waltersi Nelson, 1985
 Agrilus wasmanni Obenberger, 1933
 Agrilus watanabei Tôyama, 1985
 Agrilus waterhousei Kerremans, 1892
 Agrilus weilli Baudon, 1968
 Agrilus wenzeli Knull, 1934
 Agrilus westermanni Gory & Laporte, 1837
 Agrilus wewakinus Curletti, 2006
 Agrilus weyersi Kerremans, 1900
 Agrilus wichmanniellus Obenberger, 1960
 Agrilus wilsoni Baudon, 1968
 Agrilus windhoeki Obenberger, 1935
 Agrilus wittemani Jendek, 1994
 Agrilus woodi Obenberger, 1935
 Agrilus woodlarkianus Kerremans, 1900
 Agrilus wrighti Curletti, 2008
 Agrilus wuhlwuhl Curletti, 2002
 Agrilus wytsmani Obenberger, 1933
 Agrilus xanthias Descarpentries & Villiers, 1963
 Agrilus xanthograptus Obenberger, 1935
 Agrilus xantholomus (Dalman, 1823)
 Agrilus xanthonotus Waterhouse, 1889
 Agrilus xantippus Kerremans, 1913
 Agrilus xenius Obenberger, 1924
 Agrilus xipetoteci Fisher, 1938
 Agrilus xiphion Obenberger, 1933
 Agrilus xucotzinae Fisher, 1938
 Agrilus xylochaerus Obenberger, 1947
 Agrilus yakushimensis Tôyama, 1985
 Agrilus yamabusi Miwa & Chûjô, 1940
 Agrilus yamajii Tôyama, 1985
 Agrilus yamawakii Kurosawa, 1957
 Agrilus yami Kaino, 1938
 Agrilus yasumatsui Kurosawa, 1964
 Agrilus yemenita Curletti & van Harten, 2002
 Agrilus yiacatecutli Fisher, 1938
 Agrilus yonahaensis Tôyama, 1985
 Agrilus yulensis Obenberger, 1924
 Agrilus yunnanicola Obenberger, 1936
 Agrilus yunnanus Obenberger, 1927
 Agrilus yvesi Curletti, 2005
 Agrilus yxtliltoni Fisher, 1938
 Agrilus zamboangensis Fisher, 1921
 Agrilus zanthoxylumi Zhang & Wang, 1992
 Agrilus zarudnyi Obenberger, 1933
 Agrilus zebratus Curletti, 1998
 Agrilus zhelochovtsevi Alexeev, 1981
 Agrilus zhongdian Jendek in Jendek & Grebennikov, 2009
 Agrilus ziegleri Niehuis, 2006
 Agrilus zigzag Marseul, 1866
 Agrilus zikani Obenberger, 1935
 Agrilus zonatus Kerremans, 1898
 Agrilus zoster Curletti, 2009
 Agrilus zuluanus'' Obenberger, 1935

References

 
Buprestidae genera
Woodboring beetles
Articles containing video clips
Taxa named by John Curtis